= TVE test card =

Test card used by TVE in Spain

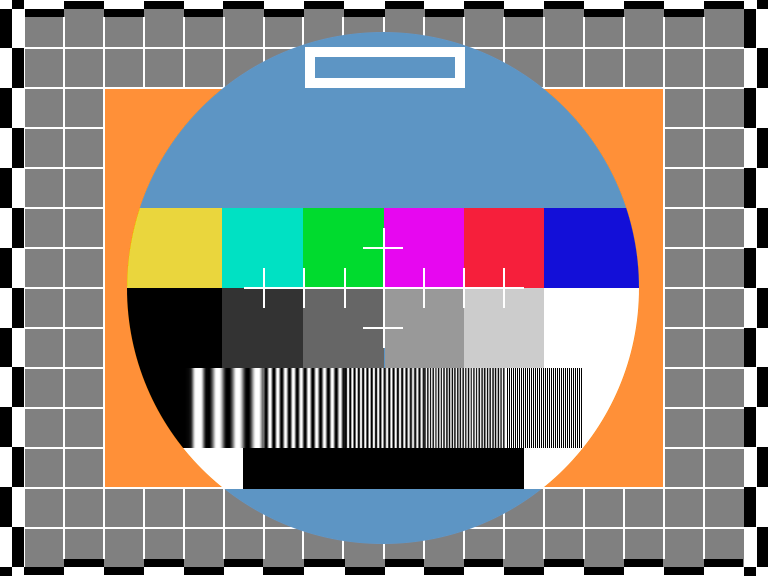
Recreation of the TVE test card pattern

The TVE colour test card (Spanish: Carta de ajuste en color de TVE) was an electronic analogue TV test card adopted by Televisión Española with the introduction of PAL colour broadcasts in 1975. It is notable for its unique design, created by the Danish engineer Finn Hendil (1939–2011) in 1973, under the supervision of Erik Helmer Nielsen at the Philips TV & Test Equipment laboratory in Amager, south of Copenhagen, the same team that developed the popular Philips PM5544 test pattern. It replaced a previous black and white version developed by Eduardo Gavilán.

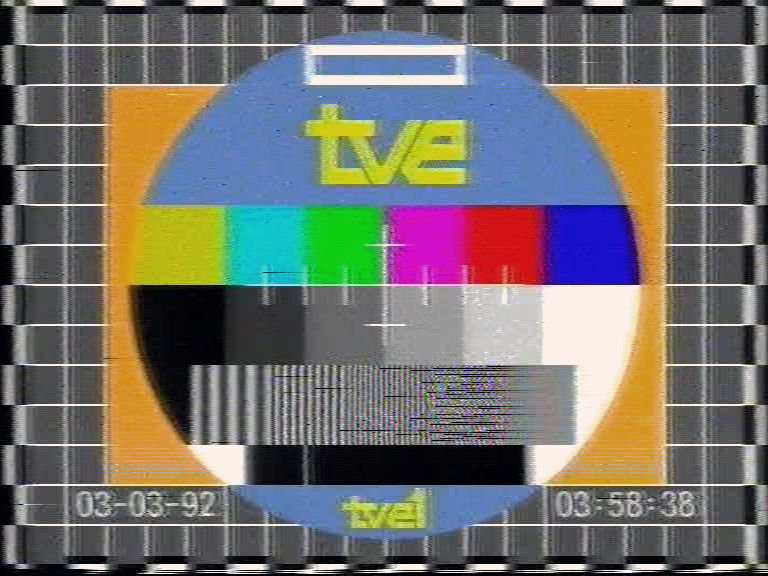
Off-air recording of TVE 1 version (1990–93 version, on 3 March 1992)

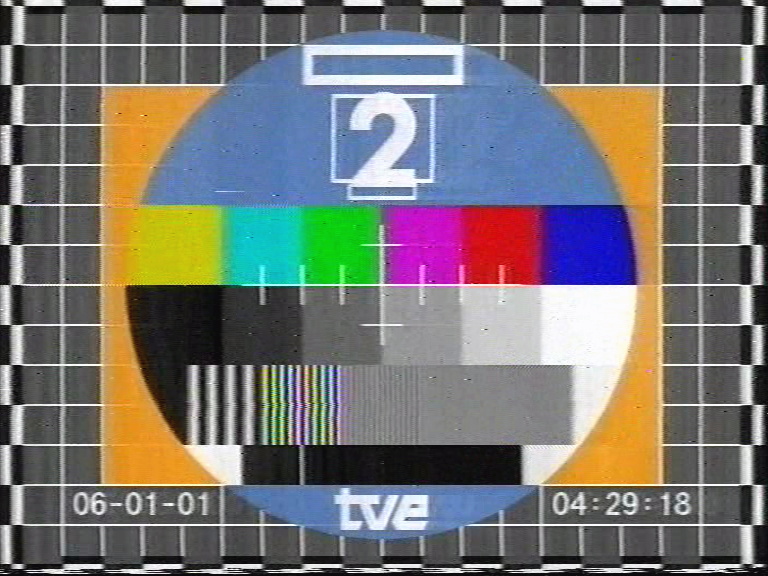
Off-air recording of TVE 2 version (on 6 January 2001, the final day of broadcast before starting 24/7 transmissions)

The test card was considered part of the regular TV schedule, figuring among daily program listings published in newspapers and magazines. It was said to be the most viewed program in some days due to people watching the test card while waiting for broadcasts to start in the afternoon. It was also relevant in the context of general work strikes, where the test card was sometimes broadcast in place of regular programming, marking it a visible sign of the strike's success.

It was used on several TVE channels, like TVE 1, TVE 2, Canal Clásico, Teledeporte or TVE Internacional.

With the start of continuous 24-hour broadcasting on TVE's channels, the test card was phased out. It stopped being broadcast on La Primera in 1996 and on La 2 in the early morning hours of 6 January 2001, although it continued to be broadcast sporadically on Teledeporte and TVE Internacional until 2005.

== Operation and features ==
As Televisión Española adopted the PAL colour system in 1975, the test card has specific elements that allow proper colour adjustments. Being a creation of the same team behind the Philips PM5544 test card, it has many elements in common with it (like colour and grey bars or castellations), but introduces some differences (for example, different resolution gratings and coloured background rectangle and circle).

There were two generations of the TVE test card. The original was generated by a heavily modified PM5544 which displays the station name at the bottom of the circle using a programmable character generator. From the early 1990s onwards the appearance of the test card changed, with the station name becoming a graphic and clock font now being identical to that of the PM5644 (which was available by that time and likely to explain such changes) thus the original hardware was likely replaced.

=== Castellations ===
The alternating white and black boxes around the perimeter are called castellations. They are used to set overscan (castellations should be visible) and check for the low-frequency response of the entire transmission chain.

=== Grid ===
The background features a grid composed of perfect squares of 100% intensity white lines.

This element allows for:

- Verifying the geometry of the image (horizontal and vertical size and linearity, cushion or barrel distortion effects);
- Adjusting the CRT convergence (the three electron guns, one for each primary color, need to target the same place);
- Adjusting the CRT focus;
- Checking the CRT color purity when displaying the 50% intensity gray background.

=== Rectangle ===
This element is composed of an orange rectangle, framed with a white line, and located at the image center.

It allows for:

- Checking proper chrominance delay, essential for good PAL system operation;
- Visualizing low-frequency image distortions;
- Adjusting maximum color saturation.

Signal values of this element are:

| Color | Luminance | Chroma amplitude | Chroma Φ | Saturation |
|---|---|---|---|---|
| Orange | 0.66 | 0.369 | 135º | 0.99 |

=== Circle ===
This element is composed of a light blue circle, also located at the center of the image. With a diameter of 512 lines, it overlaps the rectangle mentioned previously. The circle provides a quick overview of image geometry.

Signal values of this element are:

| Color | Luminance | Chroma amplitude | Chroma Φ | Saturation |
|---|---|---|---|---|
| Light Blue | 0.45 | 0.169 | -45º | 0.87 |

=== Box ===
Located at the top of the circle and composed of 100% white lines, it allows for verification of the low-frequency response of the transmission chain.

=== Colour bars ===
Inside the circle, there's a section of colour bars with 75% amplitude and 100% saturation (EBU color bars), that allows checking chrominance parameters on a vectorscope or waveform monitor.

The signal values of these bars are:

| Color | Luminance | Chroma amplitude | Chroma Φ |
|---|---|---|---|
| Yellow | 0.67 | 0.336 | 167.1º |
| Cyan | 0.53 | 0.474 | 283.5º |
| Green | 0.44 | 0.443 | 240.7º |
| Magenta | 0.31 | 0.443 | 60.7º |
| Red | 0.23 | 0.474 | 103.5º |
| Blue | 0.086 | 0.336 | 347.1º |

=== Centre Grid ===
This element is composed of 100% white lines located at the centre of the image, between the colour bars and the greyscale. It helps with image centring adjustment and allows checking for CRT convergence at the centre of the screen.

=== Greyscale Bars ===
Beneath the colour bars, there's a greyscale bar with six steps. This allows checking gamma correction of the television receiver, and linearity response of the transmission chain.

The brightness value of each step varies with a ratio of 20%, as follows:

| 0% | 20% | 40% | 60% | 80% | 100% |

=== Grating Bars ===
Located within the circle, the gratings are composed of alternating white and black lines. Horizontal frequency response (horizontal resolution) can be determined by five frequency gratings of 0.5, 1.25, 2.25, 4.2, and 4.8 MHz. The last two gratings must show interference from the 4.43 MHz PAL colour carrier.

=== Pulse Signal ===
A pulse signal bar is placed under the frequency gratings, consisting of a black rectangle with a white vertical line, corresponding to a 2T pulse. This signal shows the status of the transmission chain at high frequencies, as well as ghosting due to signal echoes.

=== Station Identification ===
Other elements like TV network identification ("TVE", "TVE1", "La Primera", "TVE2", "Teledeporte", "Canal Clásico", "TVE Internacional"), specific TV channel logos or a clock were usually added to the test pattern.

== See also ==
- Philips PM5540
- Telefunken FuBK
