= Canal Nostalgia =

Spanish television channel

- Country: Spain
- Network: TVE

Programming
- Language: Spanish
- Picture format: 576i (4:3 SDTV)

Ownership
- Owner: RTVE
- Sister channels: TVE 1 TVE 2 Canal 24 Horas; Canal Clásico; Docu TVE; Teledeporte; TVE Internacional

History
- Launched: 1997; 29 years ago
- Closed: 2005; 21 years ago
- Replaced by: TVE 50 Años

Canal Nostalgia was a Spanish television channel owned and operated by Televisión Española (TVE), the television division of state-owned public broadcaster Radiotelevisión Española (RTVE). It was available via pay television satellite platforms first and cable platforms later. It was known for broadcasting classic programmes from Televisión Española historical audiovisual archive.

It was launched in 1997 and discontinued in 2005, when it was closed to launch months later TVE 50 Años.

== Structure ==
Each day, 12 hours were scheduled to show programs of all kinds of genres, from 1964 (when TVE started recording its shows) to the 1980s. After the 12 hours concluded, in the night the same schedule was repeated. They only showed their own produced shows, since showing series or movies not belonging to them would require a payment to the copyright owners of them.

== History ==
Canal Nostalgia started as a satellite channel inside TVE Temática, with TVE 24 Horas, Canal Alucine and Cine Paraíso. In 1998, it was brought to Vía Digital, where it stayed until that satellite digital platform was merged with Canal Satélite Digital in 2002, becoming Digital Plus. It was then brought to cable TV through Ono, until it was discontinued in June 2005. Months later, in November 2005, a new channel named TVE 50 Años with similar structure was launched through Digital terrestrial television to celebrate TVE's 50th anniversary. In the last months, from February 2005, it was also available in the United States and Canada via Intelsat Americas 13.
