= TVE 50 Años =

- Country: Spain
- Network: TVE

Programming
- Language: Spanish
- Picture format: 576i (4:3 SDTV)

Ownership
- Owner: RTVE
- Sister channels: TVE 1 TVE 2 Canal 24 Horas; Canal Clásico; Docu TVE; Teledeporte; TVE Internacional

History
- Launched: 30 November 2005 (20 years ago)
- Replaced: Canal Nostalgia
- Closed: 1 January 2007 (19 years ago)
- Replaced by: Clan

TVE 50 Años was a Spanish free-to-air television channel owned and operated by Televisión Española (TVE), the television division of state-owned public broadcaster Radiotelevisión Española (RTVE). It was created to commemorate the fiftieth anniversary of Televisión Española and was known for broadcasting classic programmes from its historical audiovisual archive.

It was launched on 30 November 2005 time-sharing schedule with Clan. They replaced Canal Nostalgia that was discontinued several months before. TVE 50 Años was discontinued on 1 January 2007 and Clan expanded broadcast to a 24-hour schedule.

== Ratings ==
- Share
- 0,45 (May 2001)
- 0,48 (January 2002)
- 0,47 (February 2002)
- 0,49 (2003)
- 0,47 (2004)
- 0,57 (2005)
- 0,54 (2006)
- 0,59 (End)
- 0,50 (January 2007)
