= Video-signal generator =

Signal generator which outputs video waveforms

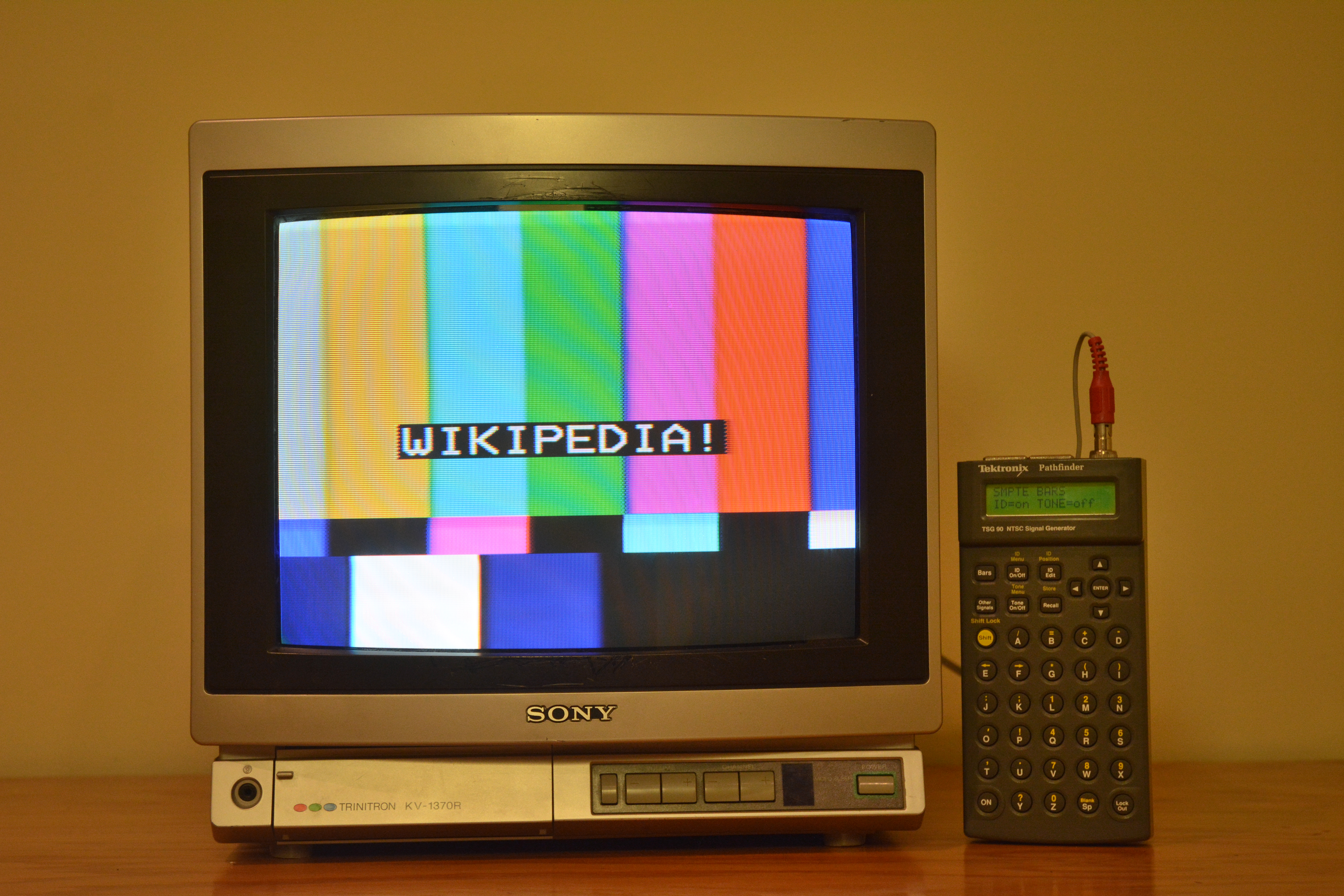
An NTSC video signal generator connected to a Sony Trinitron television set showing SMPTE Color Bars

A video signal generator is a type of signal generator which outputs predetermined video and/or television waveforms, and other signals used in the synchronization of television devices and to stimulate faults in, or aid in parametric measurements of, television and video systems. There are several different types of video signal generators in widespread use. Regardless of the specific type, the output of a video generator will generally contain synchronization signals appropriate for television, including horizontal and vertical sync pulses (in analog) or sync words (in digital). Generators of composite video signals (such as NTSC and PAL) will also include a color burst signal as part of the output.

== Types of video signal generators ==
Video signal generators are primarily classed according to their function. In addition, they may be classified according to the video formats and interface standard they support—one generator may generate composite analog signals (typically NTSC, PAL, or both), another may generate CCIR 601, and a third may generate MPEG streams over an ASI.

Many manufacturers sell signal generation platforms, which can be populated with multiple modules providing the above capabilities (and supporting different formats). Many such platforms also include audio generation capability (as television includes audio as well as video), supporting either embedded audio or standalone audio formats.

=== Test signal generators ===
A test signal generator generates test patterns, and other useful test signals, for troubleshooting and analyzing television systems. These devices are generally intended for off-line use (test patterns are seldom broadcast, unless a station is not operating properly or is off the air at the time), as they output complete television signals. Examples of signals output by such a device include:

- Color bars, one of several test signals used to verify the proper reproduction of a TV system's color gamut, and/or that a television signal or plant is compliant with the appropriate analog transmission standards
- Flat fields, a signal consisting of nothing but a specific color (typically white, black, a shade of gray, or one of the primary colors (red, green, and blue) at maximum saturation). A red field is especially important in PAL applications, as it is the "red difference" portion of the chroma signal whose phase alternates every line; the red field should appear as a solid block of color, with no visible "bands" going across the screen.
- Multibursts, sweeps, and pulse signals, used to test the frequency response of a television system
- Ramp signals and staircase signals, used to check the voltage linearity of a television system
- Crosshatch patterns, used to check and calibrate alignment, aspect ratio, convergence, and both vertical and horizontal linearity
- The bowtie signal, used to check the relative (inter-channel) timing of a component video signal.

Some generators achieved a relative popularity, due to channels broadcasting test cards for long periods where no programming was scheduled. Patterns associated with Philips (PM 5540, PM 5552, PM 5544, PM 5644), Grundig VG 1001 (FuBk) SMPTE (Color Bars), or Snell & Wilcox (Zone Plate) generators are generally well known.

A few specialized signals are used in digital environments:

- The PLL test signal is a pathological test signal used to stress the phase-locked loop of a serial digital receiver; this is done by outputting a bit pattern which, after passing through the linear feedback shift register used to scramble serial digital signals, resulting (with a high degree of probability) in a long strings of zeroes or ones, followed by a long string of the opposite polarity, on the digital (NRZI) signal; an issue which can cause poorly designed PLLs to unlock.
- The equalizer test signal is another pathological signal, consisting of a long string of zeroes or ones, followed by a single bit of the opposite polarity. It can cause poorly designed cable equalizers to malfunction.
- The SDI Checkfield signal, standardized by SMPTE RP178 (for SD) and RP198 (for HD), is a test signal which contains one of the above signals in the upper portion of the video, and the other in the lower portion of the video.

In addition, sophisticated signal generators may allow modification of the video timing, adjustment of the gains of the various components (including out of range), the introduction of jitter or bit errors (into digital signals), the introduction of motion, or other effects.

=== VITS inserters ===
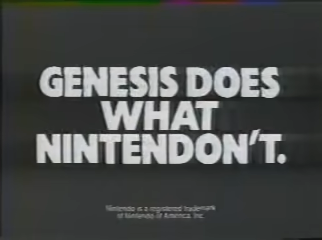
Screenshot from Sega Genesis commercial showing visible VITS color bars from the broadcast on the top of the image

A vertical interval test signal inserter, or VITS inserter inserts test patterns into the vertical interval of a television signal. Unlike test signal generators; a VITS inserter is used to insert the test signal into live programming, so that inline measurements of a transmission chain can be made while the chain is operational. (As the vertical interval is typically not visible on end-user televisions, this can be done without producing any artifacts noticeable to viewers). Since VITS signals can often be transmitted, it is also possible for a television station to receive its own on-air feed, and use the VITS to detect and troubleshoot problems in on-air transmission.

=== Sync pulse generator ===
A sync pulse generator (SPG) is a special type of generator which produces synchronization signals, with a high level of stability and accuracy. These devices are used to provide a master timing source for a video facility. The output of an SPG will typically be in one of several forms, depending on the needs of the facility:

- A continuous wave signal
- In standard-definition applications, a bi-level sync signal, often with a color burst signal in facilities that have analog equipment. Typically, this is either in NTSC or PAL format. As the resulting signal is usually indistinguishable from an all-black television signal of the same format, this sort of reference is commonly known as black or black burst.
- In some high-definition applications, a 'tri-level sync' signal is used instead. This signal is virtually identical to the synchronization signal used in component analogue video (CAV); and is similar to the synchronization signals used in VGA (the main difference being, in VGA the horizontal and vertical syncs are carried on different wires; whereas TLS signals include both H and V syncs).

=== Logo inserters ===
Logo inserters are devices used to insert a television station's logo, or other fixed graphics, into a live television signal. Often called a "Bug Generator."

== See also ==
- Video display controller
- Philips PM5540
- Telefunken FuBK
- ETP-1
- Test card
