= ETP-1 =

Test card used by IBA

Recreation of ETP-1 used by IBA

Off-air recording of ETP-1 as seen on ITV from 1979 to 1988

ETP-1 (or Electronic Test Pattern One) was a test card designed and used by the Independent Broadcasting Authority (IBA). After test transmissions from the IBA's Engineering Regional Operations Centre (ROC) in Croydon from 1978 it was phased in on ITV over a period starting from 1979, replacing, in different ITV regions: Test Card F, Test Card G and full screen height EBU colour bars. After ITV went 24 hours in 1988, the card ceased to be seen on the channel. It was used for both 625-line PAL and 405-line monochrome broadcasts.

Throughout the 1980s, it was seen extensively on both Channel 4 and S4C during both their pre-launch tests and during the day, due to their limited broadcast hours early on, and shortly after launch it alternated with in-vision teletext broadcasts. On these channels, it was captioned either IBA:CH4 or IBA:S4C, with lines above and below this indicating the card was being generated by the channel, the absence of these lines meant it was generated at the transmitter.

After the splitting up of the IBA in 1990, the captioning was changed to NTL:CH4/NTL:S4C. ETP-1 was last broadcast on 31 December 1992 after which Channel 4 showed 4-Tel on View during closedown periods as the channel gradually increased its late night programming, eventually going 24 hours a day early in 1997. After the conclusion of its late-night teleshopping block, S4C shows a closedown slide promoting its S4C Clic VOD service with library music playing in the background during off-air hours.

On 18 April 2012, ETP-1 made one final appearance on Channel 4 to announce the loss of analogue television services in the London region. The card was shown from the Crystal Palace transmitter only, and was the last thing broadcast by analogue Channel 4 before the signal was switched off.

== Operation ==
The test card was generated electronically by a video generator, and includes features for various adjustments and checks:

- Crosshatch pattern - For CRT color convergence check
- EBU colour bars - Six colour bars at 75% amplitude and 100% saturation for colour adjustments
- Greyscale bar - Six bars at 0%, 20%, 40%, 60%, 80% and 100% amplitude. Allows checking of brightness linearity.
- Multiburst - Six bars of sine wave frequency gratings for bandwidth/resolution check (625 lines: 1.5, 2.5, 3.5, 4.0, 4.5, 5.25 MHz; 405-line: 1.0, 1.6, 2.25, 2.6, 2.9, 3.4 MHz ).
- 150 kHz square waves - Transient response check, placed above the colour bars.
- Black rectangle within white rectangle - For low frequency response check.
- White needle pulse - Signal reflections check.
- Yellow-red-yellow rectangles - Chrominance/luminance delay check.
- Line synchronisation castellations - Pattern of rectangles in black and colours.
- Colour receiver reference oscillator castellations - Correct color decoding check (Top: cyan, Bottom: green, Left: red, blue, Right: yellow).
- Picture centering castellations - some overscan is normal, but castellations should be visible along all sides of the picture.

== See also ==
- Philips PM5540
- Telefunken FuBK
