= Cultural·es =

Spanish cultural television channel

- Country: Spain

Ownership
- Owner: TVE
- Sister channels: La 1 La 2 Clan; Clásico; 24h Teledeporte; TVE Internacional

History
- Launched: 10 October 1994
- Closed: 1 September 2010
- Former names: Hispavisión (1994-1996); Grandes Documentales-Hispavisión (1997-2005); Docu TVE (2005-2009)

Links
- Website: Cultural.es

Cultural·es was a Spanish television channel owned and operated by Televisión Española (TVE), the television division of state-owned public broadcaster Radiotelevisión Española (RTVE). It was only available via pay television platform Digital+.

It was launched on 10 October 1994 and aired documentaries produced in Spanish and factual programming on a variety of themes. Through its original programming, which also included biographies and travel programmes, it sought to promote Spanish culture and history. It was discontinued on 1 September 2010.

== History ==
Cultural.es was originally known as Hispavisión from its 1994 launch until 2005, and Docu TVE (also known as Docu) from 2005 until 22 April 2009, when the channel became "Cultural.es".

TVE was planning to revamp Cultural.es as Canal Cultura ("Culture Channel") in 2011. However, the channel ceased transmission on 1 September 2010 and closed definitely on 1 January 2011 citing economical difficulties as the reason. The programming broadcast in Cultural.es would slowly integrated into TVE's La 2 network, which at the same time the broadcaster's cultural channel in September 2010. Because of the transition and also the completion of digital switchover throughout Spain, sports and children's programs on La 2 were also slowly migrated to TVE's digital specialty channels, Teledeporte and Clan, respectively.

The network bases its schedule on a different type of programming for each day of the week:

Monday: Current affairs
Tuesday: Travel
Wednesday: Science and Technology
Thursday: Art & Culture
Friday: Nature & Ecology
Saturday: Society
Sunday: History

== Logo ==
2005–2008

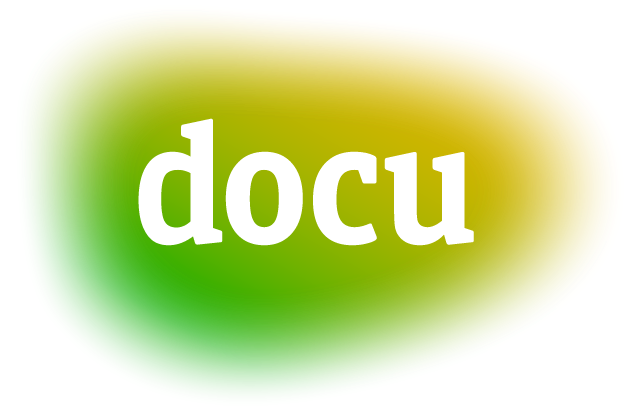
2008 – 22 April 2009
