= Cotelsat =

Spanish satellite television provider

Comercialización de Televisión por Satélite, S.A.
- Trade name: Cotelsat
- Type: Sociedad Anónima
- Industry: Satellite broadcasting
- Founded: 15 June
- Founder: Televisión Española; Antena 3 Televisión; Sogecable; Mediaset España
- Defunct: 1995
- Headquarters: Spain
- Area served: Nationwide
- Products: Pay television

Comercialización de Televisión por Satélite, S.A., dba Cotelsat, was a Spanish analog satellite television operator which delivered its signals through Hispasat, managed by Sogecable who already had experience in pay television. It lasted one year and had five channels, two from Televisión Española and one channel each from the private partners of the project (Antena 3, Canal+ and Telecinco).

== History ==
In 1992, the Hispasat satellite was put into orbit and while initially its usage for commercial television wasn't announced, with the passing of a law for cable and satellite television, it reserved two channels for TVE and three channels for private operators, for which a public contest was held which finished on 7 October 1993, granting licenses to Sociedad de Televisión Canal Plus (channel 31 at 12.302'88Mhz), Gestevisión Tele 5 (channel 35 at 12.379'60Mhz) and Antena 3 de Televisión (channel 39 at 12.456'32Mhz), since they were the only applicants.

Since then, a dispute between the licensed companies and the State for the launching of their signal started which ended with an ultimatum from the General Secretariat of Communications, setting a date for the signing of the contract for the acceptance of the chanels or the cancelling of their licenses, 12 January 1994. Finally, on 11 January, the contract was signed costing 150 million pesetas in the first year, rising to 200 in the second, 300 in the third and fourth and 500 per year for the rest of the license, as long as it would not pay for during test broadcasts.

TVE started airing its Teledeporte channel free-to-air exceptionally on 12 February 1994 and only for the 1994 Winter Olympics, held in Lillehammer, which eventually led to regular broadcasts on 4 April with 32 hours of sprots a weeb. The date of the start of experimental broadcasts, initially expected for 1 April, was moved to 4 April, as long as the private channels could not start their satellite channels, leaving TVE alone with the start of test broadcasts of Canal Clásico and regular broadcasts of Teledeporte. TVE expected the start of these broadcasts on 1 April, but delayed it to 4 April for the two channels to launch on the same day.

The channels signed an agreement on 7 March 1994 with the aim of delivering their signals encrypted, enabling TVE to air its cultural channel free-to-air. The agreement stipulated that Canal+ would be in charge of the encryption system, as well as owning the satellite system, its commercial network and its phone and technological services for maintenance. Finally, Cotelsat was formed on 15 June 1994 with an initial capital of 1 billion pesetas (four equal parts between all companies involved) and they pledged to create a package of channels with a channel for kids and teens (Tele 5), a movie channel (Canal+) and a telenovelas and home shopping channel (Antena 3), in addition to the two TVE channels. On 18 July, Ramón Villot, formerly director-general of CRTVG, was appointed as the company's director-general.

== Period of operations ==
Finally, on 5 September 1994, the remaining channels started broadcasting, initially free-to-air, except for Canal 31 which was already encrypted, and from the afternoon to midnight. Canal+ started carrying Canal 31, an encrypted movie channel without premiered, which it never marketed to interested subscribers. Antena 3 launched Antena 3 Satélite on its frequency, with a line-up based on repeats of the magazines and newscasts seen on the terrestrial channel and bullfighting and sports on weekends. Tele 5 launched Telesat 5 relaying programs from the terrestrial channel, especially children and youth programs such as Hablando se entiende la basca or Pressing Catch, as well as its newscasts. TVE started broadcasting the regular services of Canal Clásico with the airing of series, music, theatre and literary programs.

The final offer consisted of five channels delivered on the Hispasat satellite, at a time where it only had five K_{u} band (strong satellite) transponders. These were:

- Teledeporte (TVE): Sports.
- Canal Clásico (TVE): Cultural channel with documentaries, opera, theatre, films or TVE telefilms (historic or based on Spanish literature).
- Telenoticias (Antena 3): Hispanic all-news channel produced in Miami, centered on Latin American news (Antena 3 was a shareholder).
- Telesat 5 (Telecinco): Generalist channel repeating Telecinco series and studio-based programs from its beginnings (1990 to 1992).
- Cinemanía 2 (Sogecable/Canal +): Classic American movies.

== Its ephemerous existence ==
The lack of attractive contents and its reduced timeslots (except for Telenotícias, the other four channels did not air all day, only from 4/5pm to midnight), led to the closure of the platform in June 1995, ending with only 4000 subscribers. The RTVE channels continued free-to-air until the birth of Vía Digital, a platform which RTVE was an initial shareholder. The rest, except Cinemanía 2, aired free-to-air until its abandonment, a few months later. Antena 3 later obtained authorization to use its channel to carry, encrypted and using digital compression, the Cable Antena channels, though before it used the analog channel to promote Cable Antena's then-upcoming channels before the change.

The fact that Sogecable, logistical manager of the platform, was owner in parallel of Canal Satélite, could explain the supposed lack of connection with Cotelsat.
