= Philips circle pattern =

TV test pattern, used to be widely used in European (PAL) countries

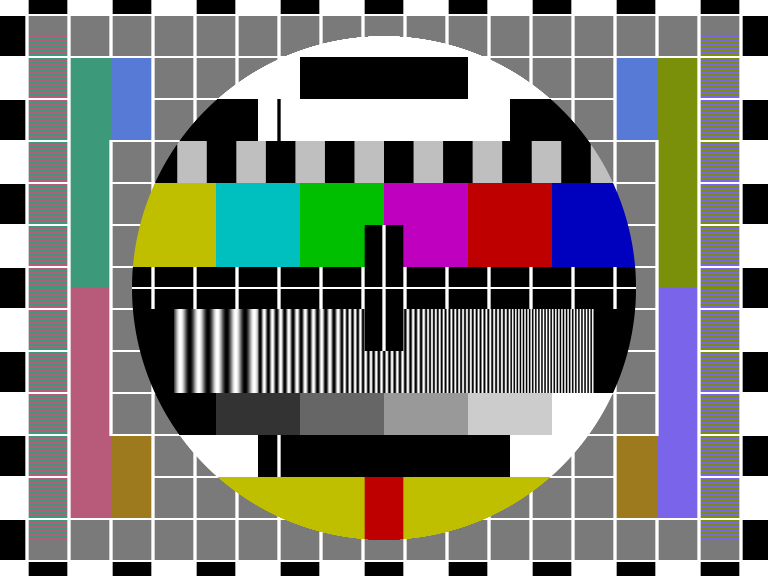
Recreation of the original 4:3 circle pattern

The Philips circle pattern (also referred to as the Philips pattern or PTV Circle pattern) refers to a family of related electronically generated complex television station colour test cards. The content and layout of the original colour circle pattern was designed by Danish engineer Finn Hendil (1939–2011) in the Philips TV & Test Equipment laboratory in Amager (moved to Brøndby Municipality in 1989) near Copenhagen under supervision of chief engineer Erik Helmer Nielsen in 1966–67, largely building on their previous work with the monochrome PM5540 pattern. The first piece of equipment, the PM5544 colour pattern generator, which generates the pattern, was made by Finn Hendil and his group in 1968–69. The same team would also develop the Spanish TVE colour test card in 1973.

Since the widespread introduction of the original PM5544 from the early-1970s, the Philips Pattern has become one of the most commonly used test cards, with only the SMPTE and EBU colour bars as well as the BBC's Test Card F coming close to its usage.

The Philips circle pattern was later incorporated into other test pattern generators from Philips itself, as well as test pattern generators from various other manufacturers. Equipment from Philips and succeeding companies which generate the circle pattern are the PM5544, PM5534, PM5535, PM5644, PT5210, PT5230 and PT5300. Other related (non circle pattern) test card generators by Philips are the PM5400 (TV serviceman) family, PM5515/16/18, PM5519, PM5520 (monochrome), PM5522 (PAL), PM5540 (monochrome), PM5547, PM5552 and PM5631.

== Operation ==
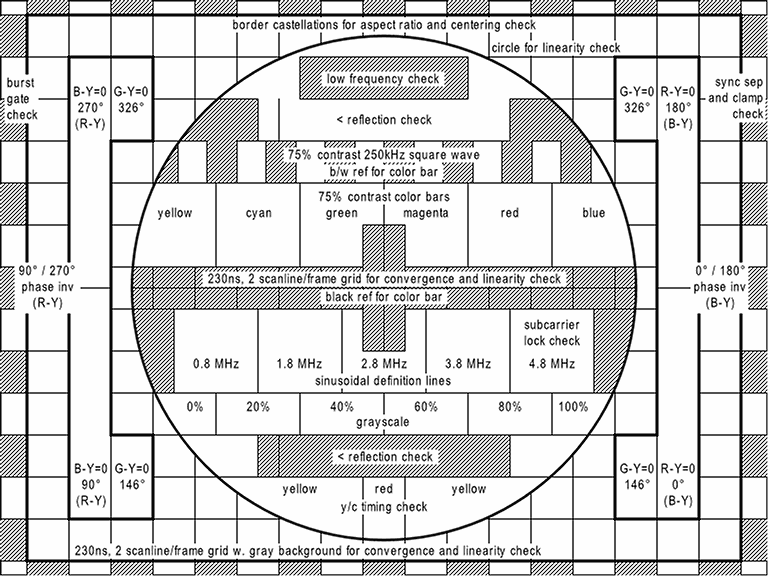
Components of the original 4:3 pattern of the PM5544.

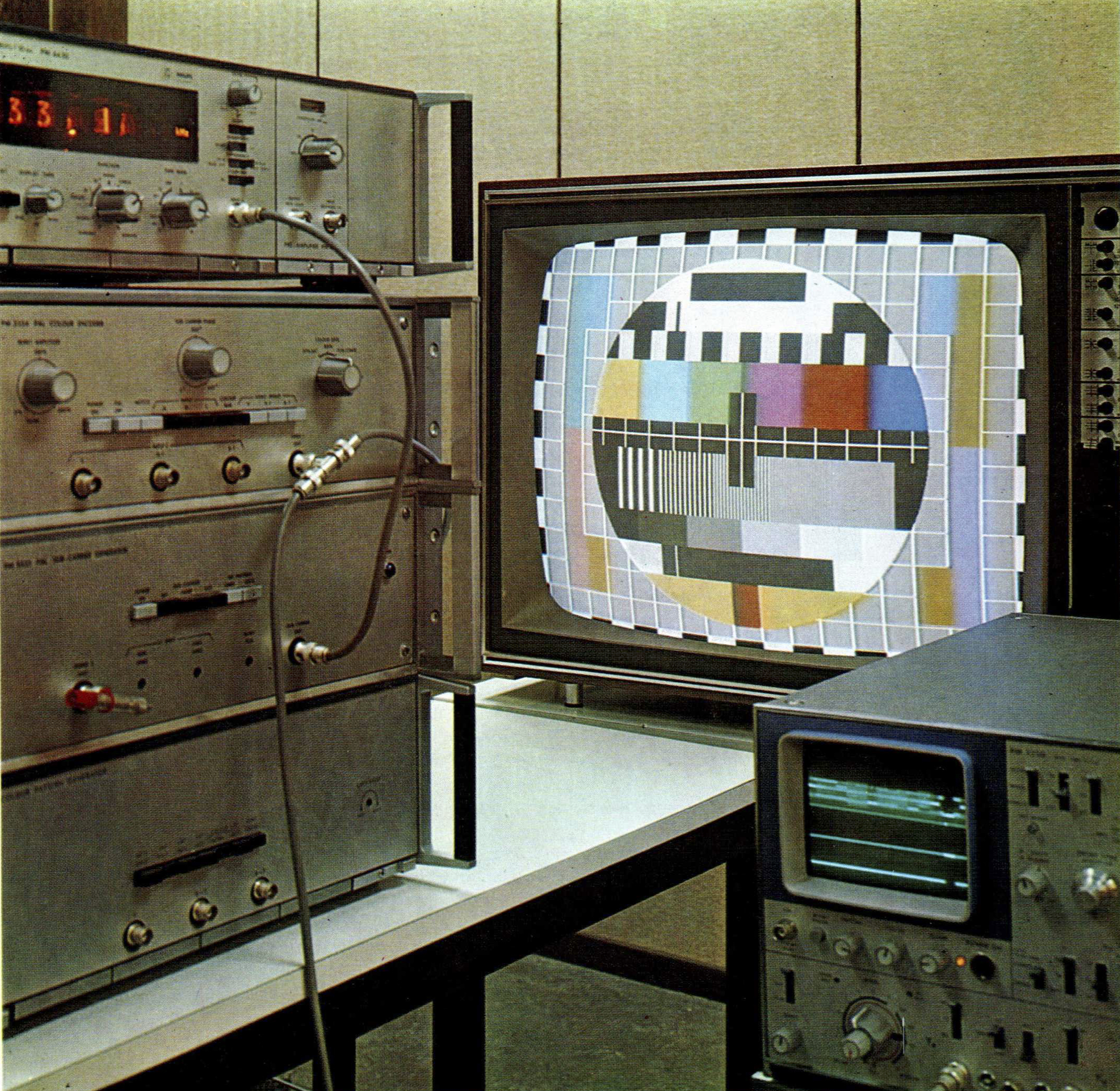
Philips PM5544 generator (bottom left) used to display test pattern on a CRT television set, connected to a PM6645 frequency counter (topmost left) and PM3400 sampling oscilloscope (bottom right)

Rather than previous test card approaches that worked by a live camera or monoscope filming a printed card, the Philips PM5544 generates the test patterns fully using electronic circuits, with separate paths for Y, R-Y and B-Y colour components ($Y'U V$), allowing engineers to reliably test and adjust transmitters and receivers for signal disturbances and colour separation, for instance for PAL broadcasts.

In simple terms, the displayed pattern provides reference levels of black, white and colour saturation, to which a receiver can be set. Displayed image geometry (image centering, correct proportions of the circle, etc.) can also be corrected. More technical adjustments are also possible.

Main technical features of the test card:

- Circle with b/w and colour information
  - Square wave – repeating black and white (75% amplitude) blocks (same amplitude as the colour bar);
  - Colour bar – yellow, cyan, green, magenta, red and blue with 100% saturation and 75% amplitude (EBU colour bars);
  - Crossed lines – at the centre of the circle, they allow to check for proper interlace;
  - Definition lines – sine wave gratings with TV line frequencies corresponding to:
    - 0.8, 1.8, 2.8, 3.8 and 4.8 MHz (PAL-B/G);
    - 1.5, 2.5, 3.5, 4.0, 4.5 and 5.25 MHz (PAL-I);
    - 0.8, 1.8, 2.8, 3.8, 4.8 and 5.63 MHz (PAL-D/K);
    - 0.5, 1.0, 2.0, 3.0 and 4.0 MHz (NTSC/PAL-M/PAL-N);
    - 0.8, 1.8, 2.8, 1.8 and 0.8 MHz (SECAM-L);
  - Stair case – greyscale with 6 levels (can display up to 11);
  - White black step with needle pulse;
  - Colour step – red on yellow background colours, 75% amplitude.
- To the left of the circle:
  - Vertical bar – line alternating positive and negative R-Y signal;
  - Vertical bars – positive and negative R-Y signal;
  - Two rectangles – G-Y signal.
- To the right of the circle:
  - Vertical bar – line alternating positive and negative B-Y signal;
  - Vertical bars – positive and negative B-Y signal;
  - Two rectangles – G-Y signal.
- Background:
  - Grid – made from 14 horizontal x 19 vertical lines;
  - Background Level – adjustable between 0 and 80% amplitude;
  - B/W border castellations.

== Pattern variations ==
=== 4:3 (original) ===
While the basic specifications of the pattern normally remain consistent, there are often small variations depending on the brand and type of generator used to produce it, as well as how the broadcaster has chosen to configure it. Some television stations have included a digital clock and/or date, as well as the station logo or ID, inside the circle. This practice was common in Asia and some parts of Europe, as well as in South Africa.

==== SECAM ====
The Philips circle pattern is geared towards the PAL colour-coding system, but SECAM versions do exist (for example, it was used by TVP in Poland, MTV in Hungary and TDF in France, without side bars, as well as ERT in Greece, VTV in Vietnam and Télé Sahel in Niger, with side bars). The most obvious difference is the absence of PAL specific test features (to two normally invisible outmost vertical bars). Less noticeable is the change to the multiburst gratings, instead at 0.8, 1.8, 2.8, 1.8 and 0.8 MHz due to the lower luminance bandwidth in the SECAM system.

==== NTSC ====
Likewise, there are 525-lines NTSC versions of the pattern. One of the NTSC variants, used in Philippines, Taiwan, Haiti and Japan (by NHK, with the multiburst gratings slightly modified for NTSC-J), has a modified square wave near the top of the circle at 300 kHz and the multiburst gratings at 0.5, 1.0, 2.0, 3.0 and 4.0 MHz. (WNYW's configuration simply removed the side colour bars.) A second variation, used by CBC Montreal in Quebec, Canada, had different gratings and added extra colour bars.

==== PAL-M ====
In addition to the 525-line NTSC pattern, a PAL-M version of the pattern was also offered for the Brazilian market. Although no public transmissions are known to exist as of November 2026, the pattern is identical to NTSC but also includes achromatic fields adjacent to the side bars.

==== PAL-N ====
Though as of November 2026 no surviving equipment or captures/recordings are known, a version of the pattern existed for the PAL-N system. It is expected to resemble the PAL-B/G pattern however with the gratings of the NTSC version.

==== BBC Test Card G ====
Test card G was a quasi-Philips pattern developed by the BBC. It is realised by the physical modification of standard PM5544 generators and differs from the original as follows:

- Colour bar saturation - 95% (changed from 75%)
- Colour bar contrast - 75% (changed from 100%)
- Colour bar set-up - 25% (changed from 0%)
- Multiburst gratings (see PAL-I listing above)
- Multiburst amplitude - 71.4% (changed from 100%)

The above specifications were incorporated back into standard Philips generators such as the PM5534I/00 and the PM5644I/00.

=== 16:9 (widescreen) ===
The widescreen version of the Philips circle pattern was designed in 1991. It was only known to be used in PAL regions and retains the signals present in the original, and features additional signals to test signal and picture quality, including Television lines resolution, corner circles and correct overscan and image centering.

Several different types of hardware are known to generate it, including the PM5644 (widescreen versions only), PT5230 and PT5300 (with appropriate pattern generator modules installed) and the PM5420.

There are two major variations of the 16:9 circle pattern. The original 1991 pattern contains high frequency components which were useful for testing widescreen televisions in factories, specifically 450/400 TVL diagonal lines and a sixth 5.8 MHz grating. This however made it sub-optimum for public broadcasts as these exceeded the bandwidth of most PAL transmission systems.

PM5644 had gratings of 0.8, 1.8, 2.8, 3.8, 4.8 and 5.5 MHz. All pattern components of the PT5230/PT5300 were within the bandwidth of PAL B/G.

Widescreen circle patterns were used by broadcasters such as RAI (Italy), BRT (Belgium), RTL-TVI (Belgium/Luxembourg), Ned3 (Netherlands), TVE (Spain) and KNR TV (Greenland).

==== NTSC ====
Although no public transmissions are known to exist as of November 2026, an NTSC widescreen version of the PM5644 and later models were available.

=== High definition ===
An HD (1080p) version of the Philips circle pattern was developed for the PT5300 via the PT8612 HD Signal Generator add-on. It was never formally integrated into the PT8612 thus was not offered for sale.

A 1250 line HD-MAC version of the Philips circle pattern also exists.

=== Squared version ===
A variation of the PM5544/34 pattern has been recorded where the circle generator is bypassed or faulty. This reveals the full contents of the central pattern elements, which are normally cropped. Anecdotally this pattern has been referred to as PM5538 however this was not a Philips pattern generator. It was used in some parts of the Middle East like Dubai 33 in the UAE and Jordan Radio and Television Corporation (JRTV) in Jordan.

=== Mainland Chinese variants ===
Starting from the 1980s, China Central Television and some provincial mainland Chinese broadcasters began using a heavily modified version of the PM5544 called the GB2097 inspection chart. Later, another modification, anecdotally called PM5549 (the Philips PM5549 was an unrelated product) began to be used at the headends of some mainland Chinese cable television providers.

== Physical equipment ==
=== PM5544 ===
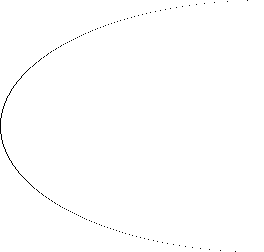
Plot of the PM5544's circle EPROM. Does not appear as a semicircle on a computer screen due to the clock rate of the circle generator.

The design of the original PM5544 is fairly complicated, with an array of analogue signal generators generating each component of the pattern continuously. Digital circuitry is used to sequence the outputs from each module into the final pattern. The circle is internally generated as a square and cropped according to coordinates defined in a 264x252 grid defining half of the circle.

The original used a very small core rope memory to store data for the circle. Suitable ROM chips were not available at the time. Four-fold symmetry was used to minimise the memory requirements. Later versions replaced the core with ROM.

The original PM5544 was not capable of generating a composite video signal by itself. At the time it was introduced three additional pieces of equipment were required:

- a PM5554 PAL colour encoder,
- a PM5555 PAL subcarrier generator,
- a PM5530 sync generator.

Over the years the physical implementation of this supporting equipment was refined, with later PM5544's only requiring two extra pieces of equipment:

- a PM5545 colour encoder,
- a PM5532 sync generator,

Eventually all the supporting equipment could be replaced by a PM5638 which fitted into a single 1RU unit.

The physical configuration of the PM5544 depends upon its purpose. A common application was in TV factories where it was typically used in its most basic configuration with no optional extras. When used for broadcasting it was usually fitted with the PM5543 text generator which allowed broadcasters to display text in the upper and lower black boxes.

It was available in 4 versions (PAL-G, PAL-M, PAL-N & NTSC) and did not have the option of an in-pattern clock (first introduced in PM5534).

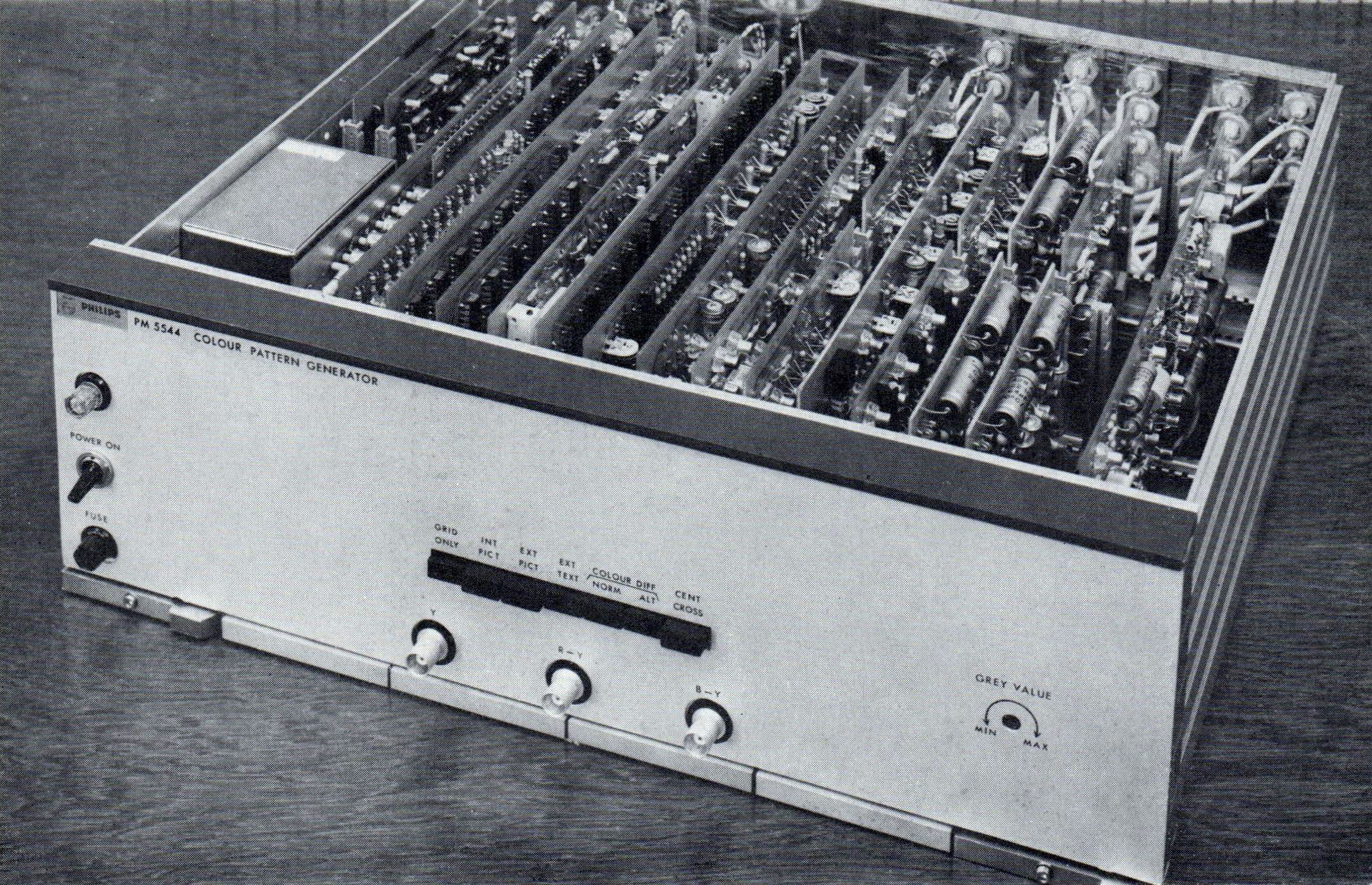
Philips PM5544 generator with top lid opened.

=== PM5534 ===
In the late-1970s, Philips introduced the PM5534 which replaced the original PM5544. It was fundamentally a very similar design using a mixture of analogue and digital circuitry to generate the pattern, however it no longer required an external sync generator and colour encoder, reducing the rack footprint from 6RU/12RU to 3RU.

The PM5534 was available as a variant with component video outputs (PM5535) and had two pattern effecting options: PM8503 text generator (station ID) and the PM8504 clock generator.

The PM5534 was available in 6 different versions: PAL-G, PAL-I, PAL-M, PAL-N, SECAM and NTSC.

=== PM5644 ===
Some time during the late-1980s Philips introduced a new design of colour pattern generator bearing the model number PM5644. The PM5644 further improves upon the PM5534 by reducing the overall size to just 1RU.

It also differs from the previous PM5544 and PM5534 in that its pattern generating circuitry is entirely digital, stored in EPROM chips allowing easy customisation of patterns. The PM5644 (and later generators) patterns' were compiled using an array of in-house tools defined by vectors in MS-DOS batch files.

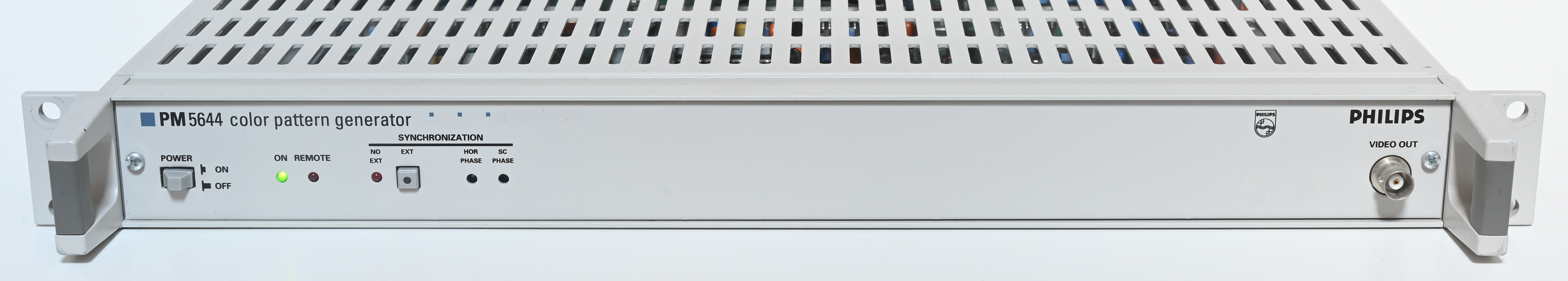
PM5644[G/M/L/P/N/I]/00 - Typical front panel of a 4:3 model.

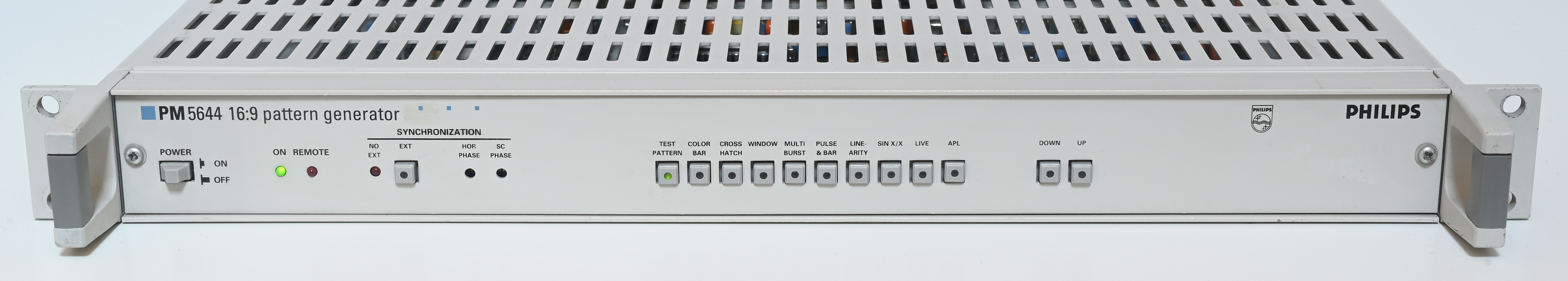
PM5644G/924 (PAL 16:9 non-PALplus).

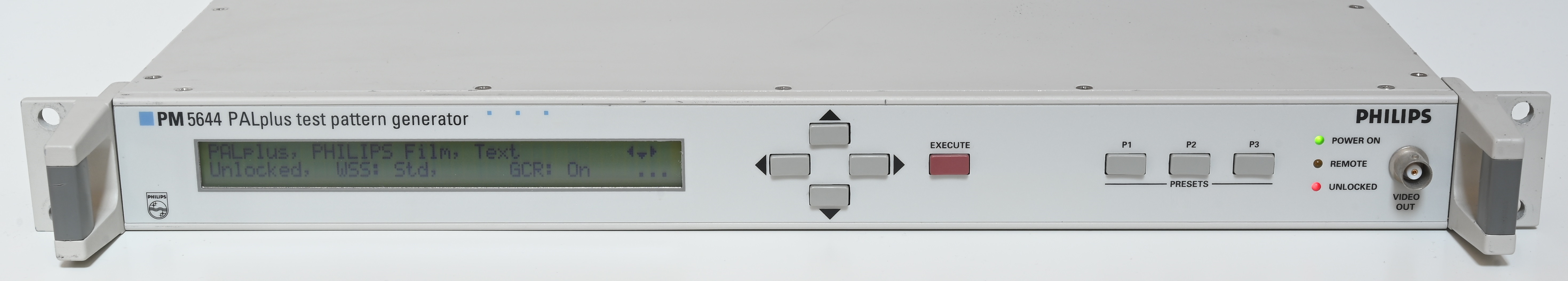
PM5644/85 (PALplus).

Many variations of the PM5644 are known to exist, each with different purposes and capabilities:

==== 4:3 models ====
The earliest design shares the chassis and the sync module with the PM5631 colour generator and has 576 KB of pattern ROM (can be increased to 4.5 MB for multiple / more complex patterns). The pattern produced by these units is nearly identical to the PM5544. Differences are typically a result of design constraints of the hardware or software generating the test cards.

Variations exist for every video standard: PM5644G/00 (PAL-B/G), PM5644I/00 (PAL-I), PM5644M/00 (NTSC), PM5644L/00 (SECAM), PM5644P/00 (PAL-M), PM5644N/00 (PAL-N). This model is able to replace every type of PM55xx pattern generator.

==== Indian head model(s) ====
A variant generating a 625 line version of the “Indian head” pattern is known to exist.

==== FuBK models ====
Two variations bearing the model numbers PM5644G/50 (PAL B/G) and PM5644G/70 (YCbCr) were available programmed with the FuBK pattern.

==== 16:9 models ====
The earliest known PM5644 16:9 hardware is the PM5644G/90 and PM5644G/924 which use the same chassis and PCB as the 4:3 models, however, both are programmed with the well-known 16:9 circle pattern alongside several other simple patterns. They generate an anamorphic signal but do not support PALplus encoding.

The last known design has controls and a display on the front panel and is labelled PM5644 PALplus test pattern generator and bears the model number PM5644/85. No other variations of this hardware are presently known. This design also generates the well known 16:9 colour circle pattern but unlike the previously mentioned G/90 and G/924 models, it is capable of encoding a PALplus signal. It also is capable of generating the 4:3 pattern of the original PM5544.

==== Custom models ====
The original PM5644 was accompanied by a service offered by Philips whereby customers could have the pattern customised. The most common type of pattern modification was a simple logo inserted in-place of the top station ID box. These models usually carry a three digit model suffix starting with '9' i.e. PM5644/9xx.

==== PM5644 HD ====
An HD version of the PM5644 is known to have existed. No surviving documentation or physical specimens are known. Aside from references to it in manuals for other products, as of November 2026 the exact specifications and purpose of it remain unknown. Schematic sheets kept by DK-Technologies reveal a digital ECL output and 3 analogue outputs with each channel capable of up to approximately 35 MHz of bandwidth.

=== PM5655 ===
In the mid-1990s Philips completed their final VITS generator/inserter, the PM5655. Some versions of it have been found which generate both Philips and FuBK patterns (4:3 and 16:9). It is not presently publicly known if this is standard or special functionality. Appearance of text is significantly different to the PM5644 and from experimentation with physical equipment it is considered likely to be responsible for at least one public transmission (from Nederland 3 in the Netherlands), which was able to be exactly recreated.

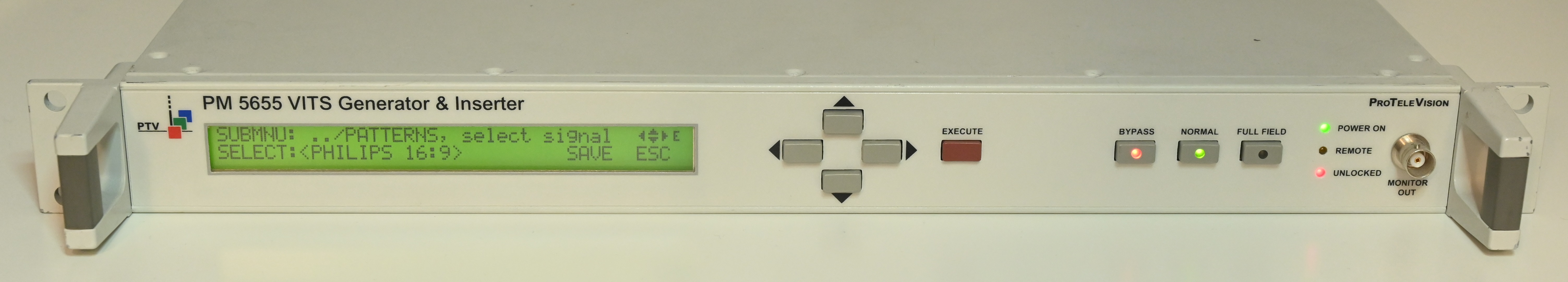
PM5655 VITS Inserter. Sold after January 23, 1998 thus branded ProTeleVision (see below).

=== PT5210/PT5230/PT5300 ===
Around 1997 with the PM5644 nearing end of life, Philips began work on the final generation of hardware that would generate the circle pattern. The first in this series was the PT5210, which through the PT8601 analogue pattern generator module, was able to generate a single complex pattern however only by special order. At least one circle pattern configuration is known.

Around this time Philips exited the TV test equipment business, with the lab that developed these products independently incorporated as ProTeleVision Technologies A/S. All products were immediately rebranded ProTeleVision.

The PT5230 was the first to exclusively carry the new brand and included an enhanced analogue pattern generator option – the PT8631, which was able to generate all Philips (NTSC and PAL) and FuBK patterns in both 4:3 and 16:9 in a single configuration. Like its predecessor (the PM5644), customer specific patterns were offered.

In 2001, shortly after the release of the PT5230, said product line was further divested to DK-Audio A/S (also based in Copenhagen, Denmark at the time). Other pattern generator products not included in the sale, but still under warranty or with active support plans such as the PM5644 and PM5534 were abandoned by ProTeleVision to be fulfilled by Arepa Test & Calibration. ProTeleVision became the current ProTelevision Technologies (lowercase 'V') shortly thereafter signifying a shift exclusively to digital transmission products.

DK-Audio (also known as DK-Technologies) subsequently released the PT5300, which superseded the PT5230, accepting all of its pattern generator modules and included many new options and features developed by DK-Audio. It was the last physical pattern generator directly descending from the original PM5544 to generate the Philips circle pattern.

SECAM was not supported by any models from this series, leaving the PM5644L as the last SECAM variant.

In 2005 the last ever custom Philips circle pattern was compiled by DK-Technologies for Danmarks Radio (DR), the first to transmit it in 1970. In 2018 the PT5300 was discontinued. In 2022 the PT5300 (and PT5210/PT5230) were open sourced by DK-Technologies.

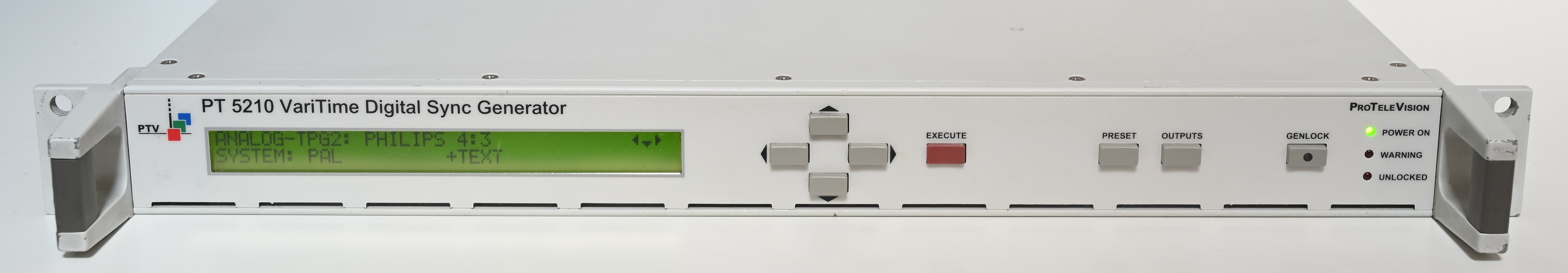
ProTeleVision branded PT5210 equipped with option PT8601/902. A special variant of PT8601 which includes the 4:3 circle pattern.

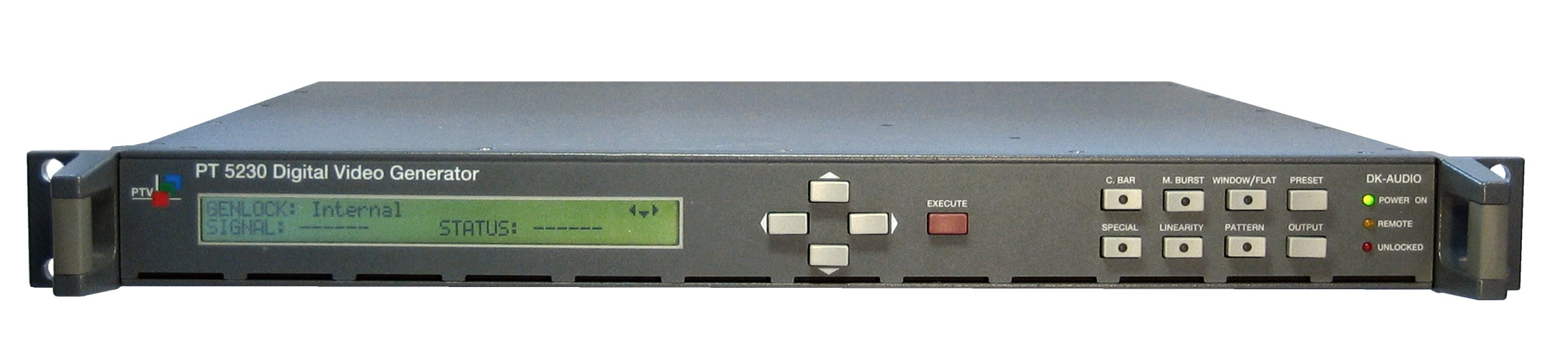
PT5230 Digital Video Generator.

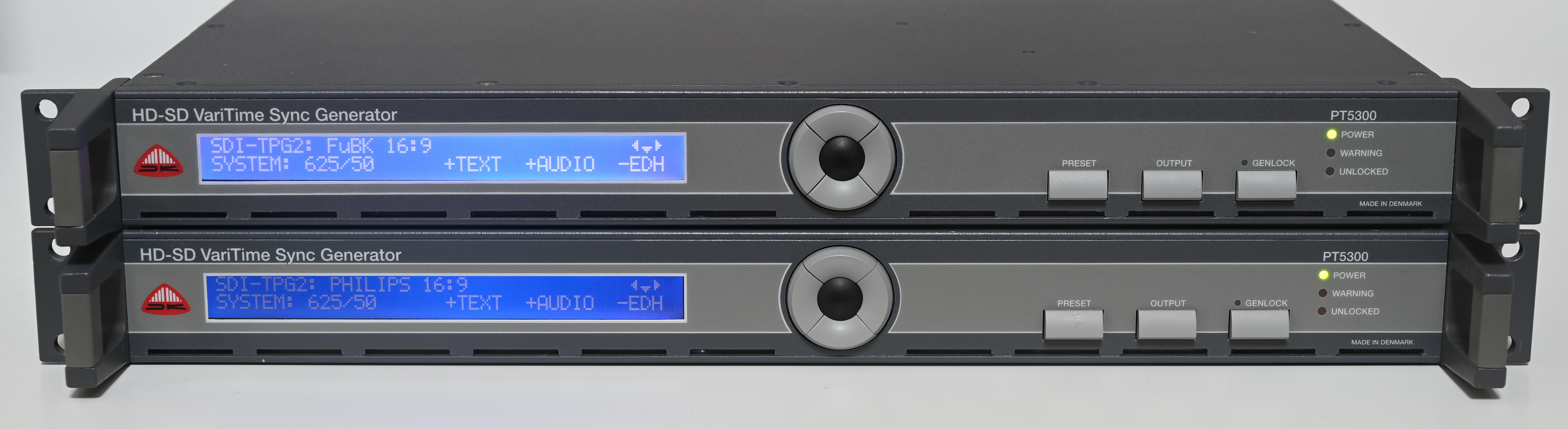
Two DK-Technologies PT5300 units equipped with options PT8633 (advanced SDI pattern generator) and PT8637 (time/date module).

==== SDI (digital) pattern generation ====
The aforementioned PT5210, PT5230 and PT5300 all optionally include SDI outputs in addition to analogue. While these products are mostly focused on patterns for digital transmission, an optional hardware upgrade was available for the PT5210, PT5230 and PT5300 (PT8603/903 for the PT5210 and PT8633 for the PT5230/PT5300) which provides the traditional 4:3 and 16:9 circle patterns of the PM5644 (in standard definition only) and offer an upgrade path for component versions of the PM5644. Although it was not the intended use-case these modules are known to have been used with exclusively digital transmissions.

In the case of the PT8633, options available include a 5 or 10 step grayscale staircase for both formats and the option to omit the corner circles for the 16:9 pattern combined with digital specific features such a moving bar in the bottom box to test if the stream is live or frozen. Due to hardware limitations, it was not possible to enable both text in the bottom box and a moving bar with the sole exception of a workaround developed for SVT. Pulsed audio can also be generated for synchronisation testing.

Known transmissions include 2RN in Ireland, TVB J2 in Hong Kong and ABC Television in Australia. Other digital pattern generators which generate patterns resembling that of the PM5644 are known such as those from Promax.

=== Non-Philips ===
Many broadcast Philips circle patterns were generated by non-Philips equipment. Such vendors include Rohde & Schwarz, Tektronix, ShibaSoku and PROMAX Electronics.

== Pattern variation gallery ==
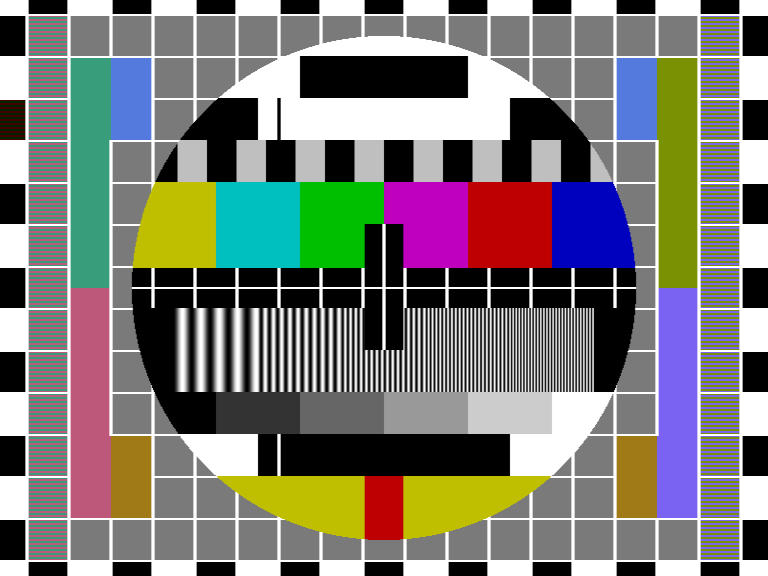
Recreation of the pattern generated by PM5544 and PM5534 with a 256-byte EPROM circle memory, giving a distinctly jagged circle.

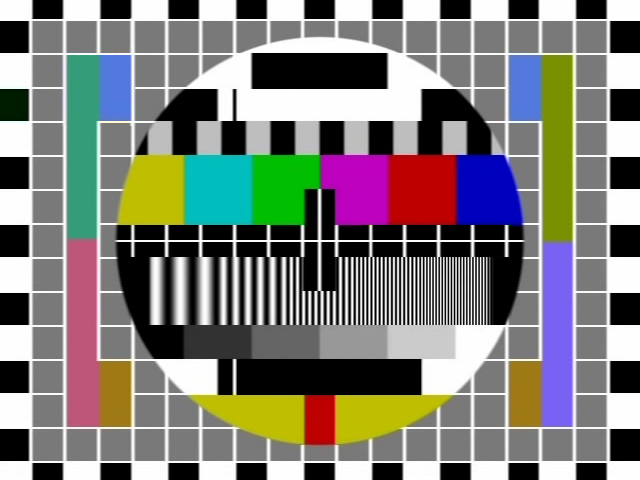
Recreation of NTSC variant as used in Philippines, Taiwan, and Haiti - The NTSC burst gate is visible in the border castellations (left border, second from the top), absence of PAL-specific signals, and different resolution gratings.

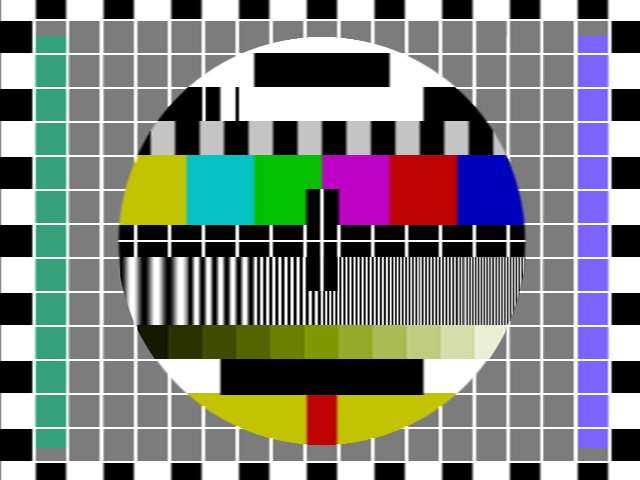
Recreation of NTSC variant as used by CBC Montreal in Canada. The resolution gratings are unique, and the luminance staircase is eleven steps, modulated with colour burst.

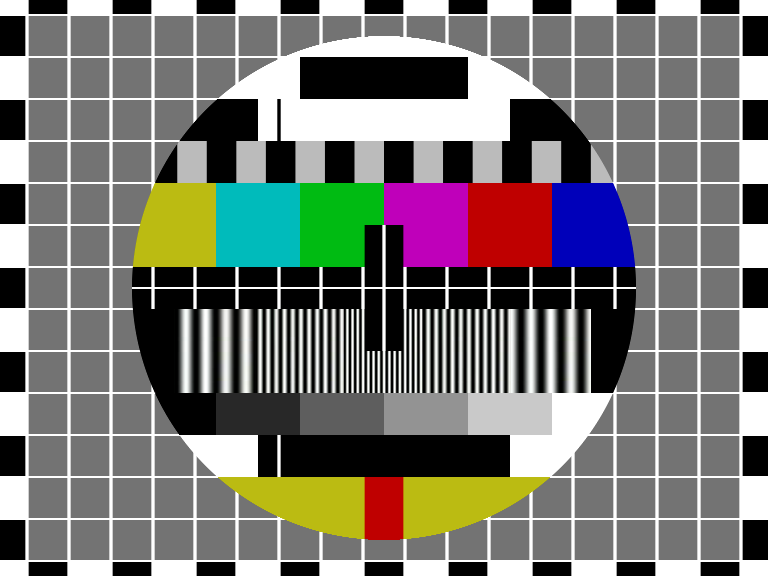
Recreation of SECAM variant as used by TDF (France), with different resolution gratings and no side colour bars. TVP Poland's configuration was similar to this but with a black background grid, ERT Greece's and VTV Vietnam's configurations included side colour bars.

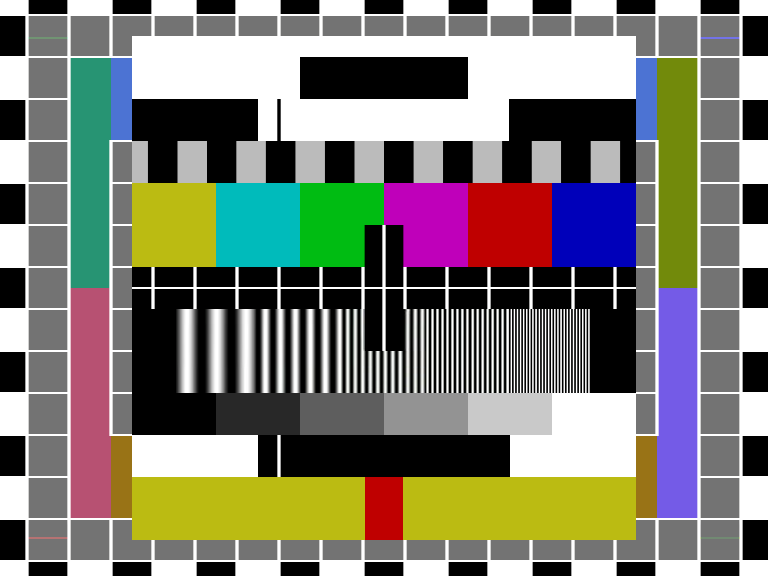
Recreation of a Philips pattern transmitted by UAE TV and JRTV where the central area appears as a square.

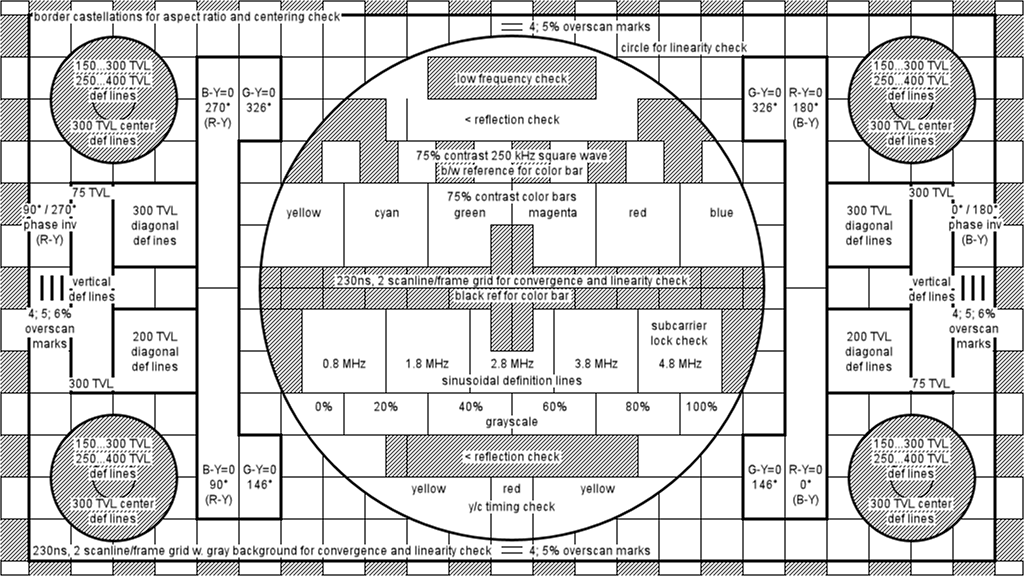
Components of the widescreen circle pattern used by the PT5230/PT5300.

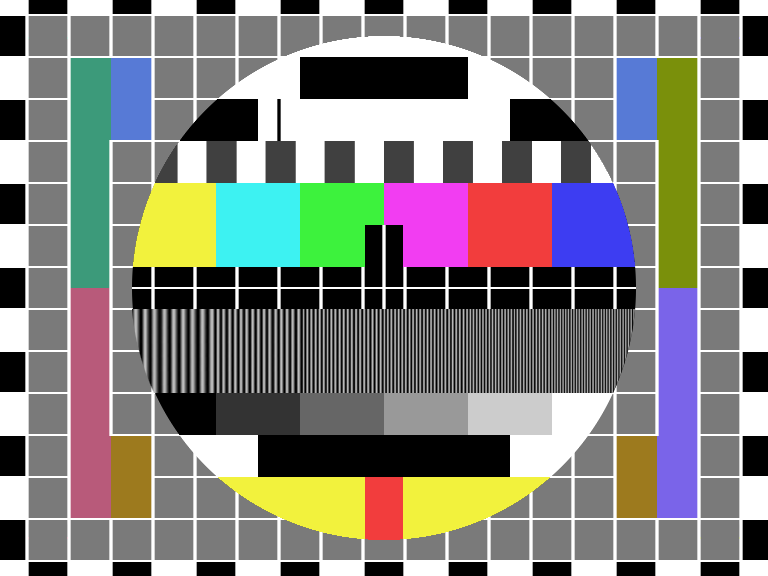
Recreation of Testcard G variation, used by BBC.

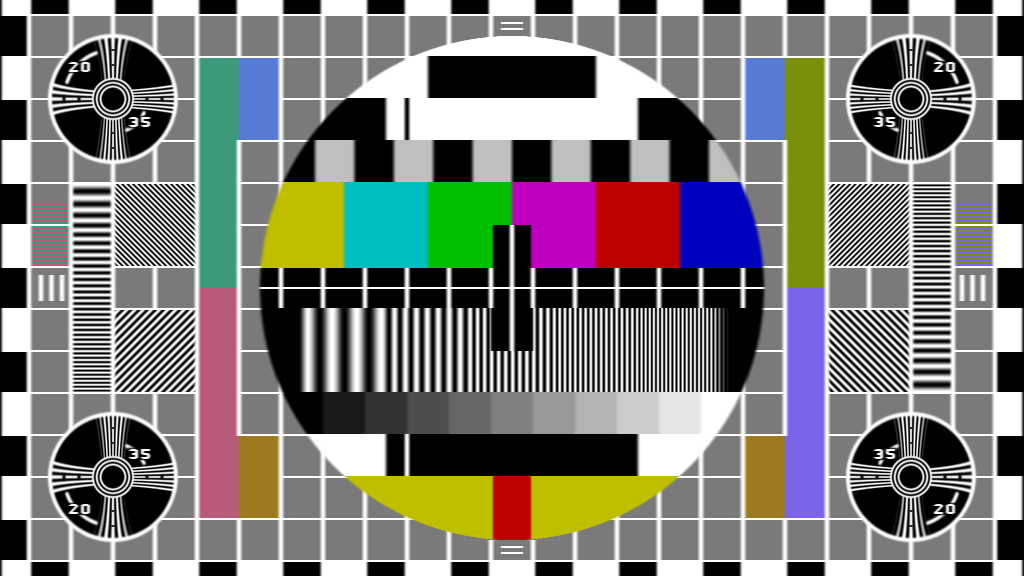
Recreation of pattern generated by the PT5230/PT5300 with 10 step grayscale staircase. Also generated by PM5644/85 (software 1.1 and later only).

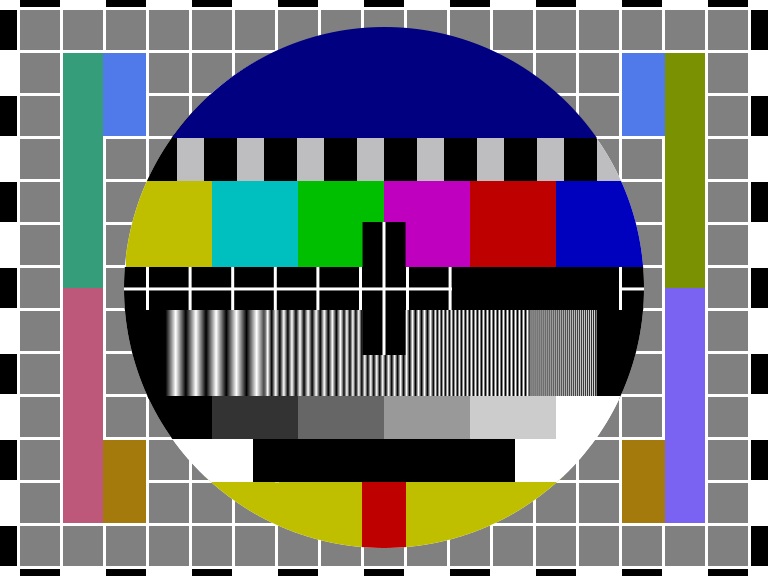
Recreation of the Philips circle pattern "Telemadrid" variation

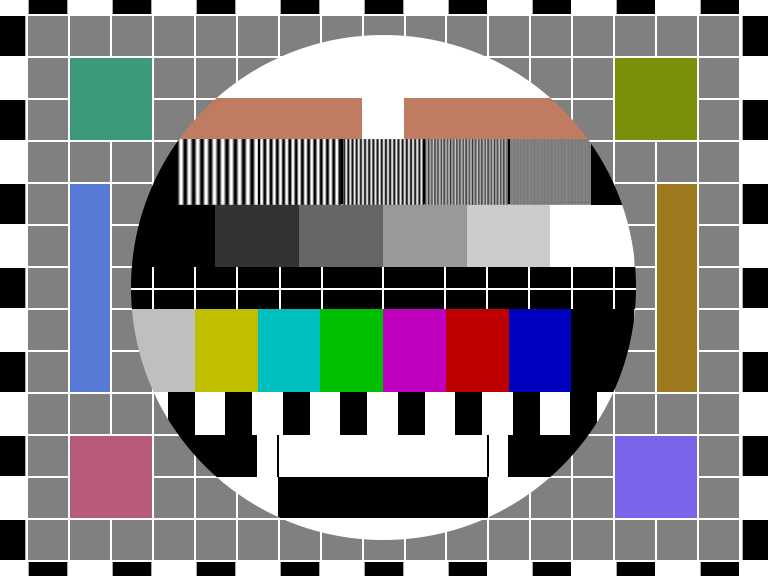
Recreation of mainland China variant "GB2097 inspection chart".

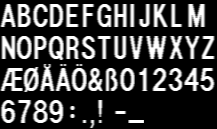
Anti-aliased character set of the PM8546 logo generator. Used by the PM5644 and later models to generate the station ID text and clock.

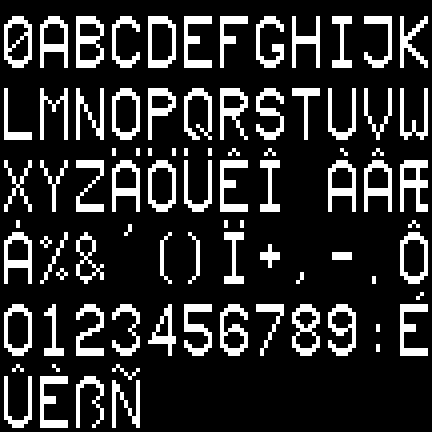
Aliased character set of the PM8503 (PM5534 text generator).

== Worldwide usage ==
=== PAL broadcasts ===
Many broadcasters that adopted the 625-line PAL system used some form of the Philips circle pattern.

==== Africa ====
In South Africa, the South African Broadcasting Corporation (SABC) made use of the PM5544 pattern since it started testing its first television system in 1975, but independent broadcasters M-Net, which launched in 1986, and e.tv, which launched in 1998, opted to use Telefunken FuBK instead.

In Zimbabwe, the Philips circle pattern was used by Zimbabwe Broadcasting Corporation (ZBC) from the start of its regular colour broadcasts in the early-1980s, replacing the Indian-head test pattern.

In Algeria, the Philips circle pattern was used by Établissement public de télévision.

In Western Sahara, a modified version of the Philips circle pattern was used by RASD TV.

==== Asia and Middle East ====
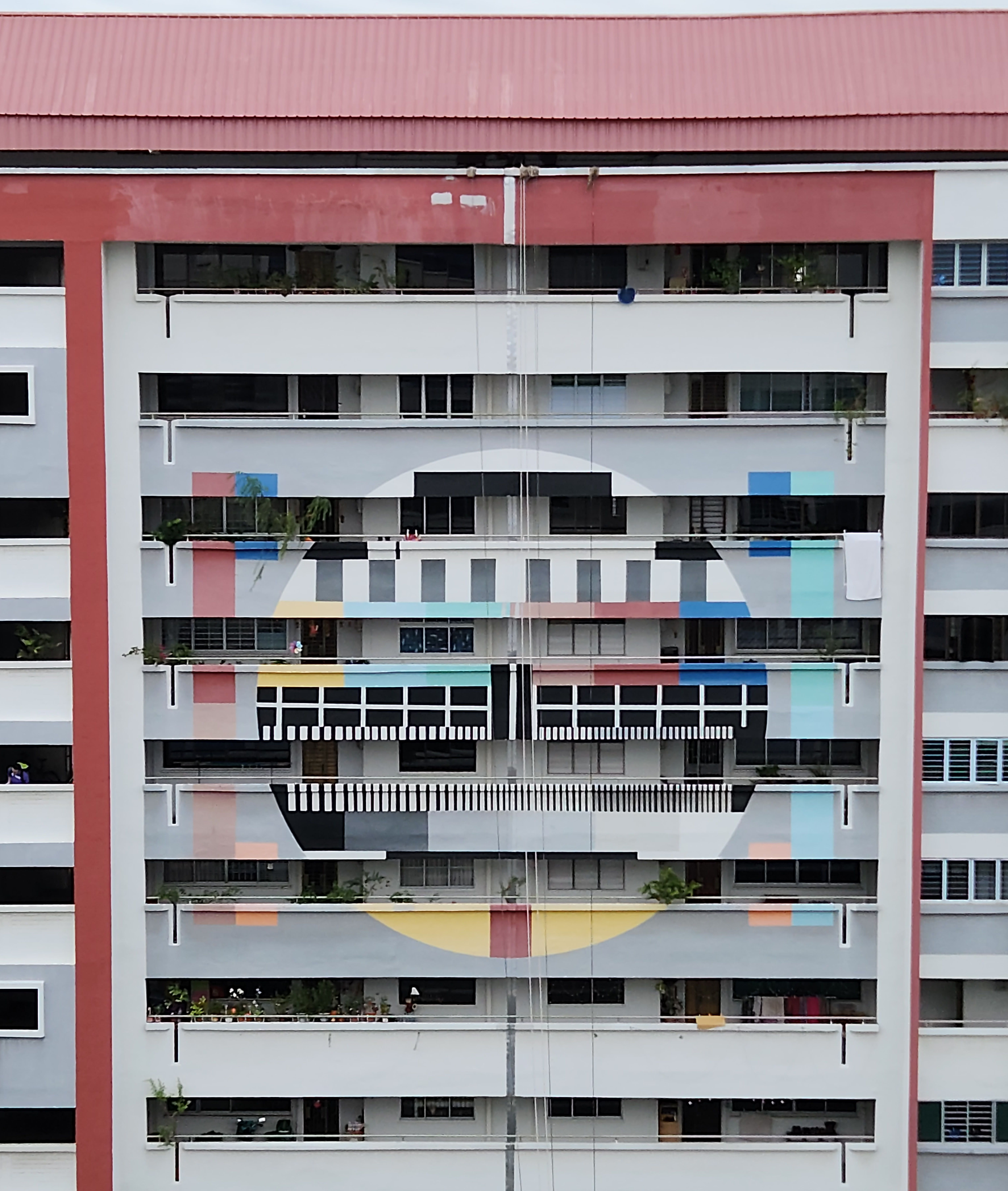
Philips circle pattern mural painted on an apartment block in Singapore.

The Philips circle pattern was first introduced in Singapore by its national broadcaster Radio Television Singapore (RTS; now Mediacorp, in conjunction with a modified version of Test Card F) upon the start of regular colour broadcasts in Singapore in 1974. While the Philips circle pattern ceased to be seen on said country's two main television channels (Channel 5 and Channel 8) upon introducing 24/7 schedules in 1995, the pattern continued to be seen on its minority and thematic channels until approximately 2005–06.

The Philips circle pattern was later introduced in Malaysia by its public broadcaster Radio Televisyen Malaysia (RTM) from its introduction of regular colour broadcasts in 1978–80 (replacing its previous monochrome Pye Test Card G) until it switched to a 24/7 schedule in 2012; and was also used by said country's first commercial station TV3 from the launch of its television service in 1984 until it adopted a 24/7 schedule in 2014.

The Philips circle pattern was also used by the Indonesian national TV broadcaster TVRI, replacing its previous Telefunken FuBK test card, from the mid-1980s until it switched to a 24/7 schedule in 2021. Then Salim-owned private Indonesian TV broadcaster Indosiar also used the same Philips PM554 circle pattern test card during sign-off period from 1995 to 2002.

In the Thailand, the Philips circle pattern was used by Channel 5 from 1974 (when station was transition to color broadcasting; replacing its previous Indian Head test pattern) until 1988 when station was replaced its by Telefunken FuBK test pattern. Philips circle pattern was also used by Channel 7 from 1995 (when station was replacing its previously Telefunken FuBK which was used from 1982 until 1995) until it switched to a 24/7 schedule on 11 March 2010. the Philips circle pattern was also used by MCOT HD (then as Channel 9) from 1995 until it switched to a 24/7 schedule in 2002. the Philips circle pattern was also used by Channel 3 in May 2010 in short time (from 21–24 May 2010) during 2010 Thai political protests. the modified version of the Philips circle pattern was also used by ThaiPBS from 2008 until 2010. the Philips circle pattern was also used by national broadcaster, NBT from 1996 until it switched to a 24/7 schedule in 2008 (until 2019).

In Brunei Darussalam, the Philips circle pattern was used by sole Brunei state-owned national television network Radio Televisyen Brunei in 1990s until 30 June 2006.

In the People's Republic of China, the Philips circle pattern was used by its national broadcaster CCTV as well as some provincial/regional broadcasters such as Shenzhen Media Group and Television Southern in Guangdong Province, Xizang STV in Tibet Autonomous Region, Yuyao TV in Zhejiang Province and Ningxia Television in Ningxia Hui Autonomous Region. CCTV also later used a heavily modified version of the PM5544 called the GB2097 inspection chart. Nowadays, many modern mainland Chinese test card designs, like in Hong Kong, incorporate elements of the PM5544, PM5644 and Snell & Wilcox test card designs. In Hong Kong, the PM5544 was used by RTV/ATV and TVB from the 1970s (replacing the RMA 1946 Resolution Chart and EIA 1956 resolution chart) until approximately 2007–09. TVB then switched to its own test card designs named PM5431. The new test card incorporating elements of the PM5544, PM5644 and Snell & Wilcox SW2 designs in HD Jade and its sister channel TVB J2 respectively, while analog TV channel remain using PM5544 until transmission fully ceased on 1 December 2020.

In Israel, the Philips circle pattern was used by Israel Broadcasting Authority (IBA) and Israeli Educational Television (IETV) from their launch of colour broadcasts in the early-1980s, replacing its previous monochrome Philips PM5540 test card after a nearly decade-long delay in introducing colour television to said country for various sociopolitical reasons.

In Qatar, the Philips circle pattern was used by Qatar TV.

In Kuwait, the Philips circle pattern was used by Kuwait Television, replacing the Indian-head test pattern.

In Jordan, the Philips circle pattern, along with the aforementioned squared variant, was used by Jordan Radio and Television Corporation (JRTV) from the start of its colour transmissions in the mid-1970s, replacing the monochrome Marconi Resolution Chart No. 1.

Saudi Broadcasting Authority (SBA) in Saudi Arabia used a heavily modified version of the Philips circle pattern from 1982 until 2009, with the side "brackets" removed and 1/4 of the top half of the PM5544 "circle" replaced with a white and black background and colour bars. Aramco TV Channel 3, broadcasting to Aramco employees and their dependents residing in the Saudi Aramco Residential Camp in Dhahran, used the standard Philips circle pattern (PM5534) with clock cut-out. These replaced a modified version of the Indian-head test pattern.

==== Oceania ====
The Philips circle pattern was also in widespread use in Australia for many years, most notably with the Australian Broadcasting Corporation (ABC) from its launch of colour broadcasts in 1974–75 and Special Broadcasting Service (SBS) from its launch of television services in 1980. Some commercial stations also used it.

In New Zealand, it was used by TVNZ from its launch of colour broadcasting in 1973.

==== Europe ====
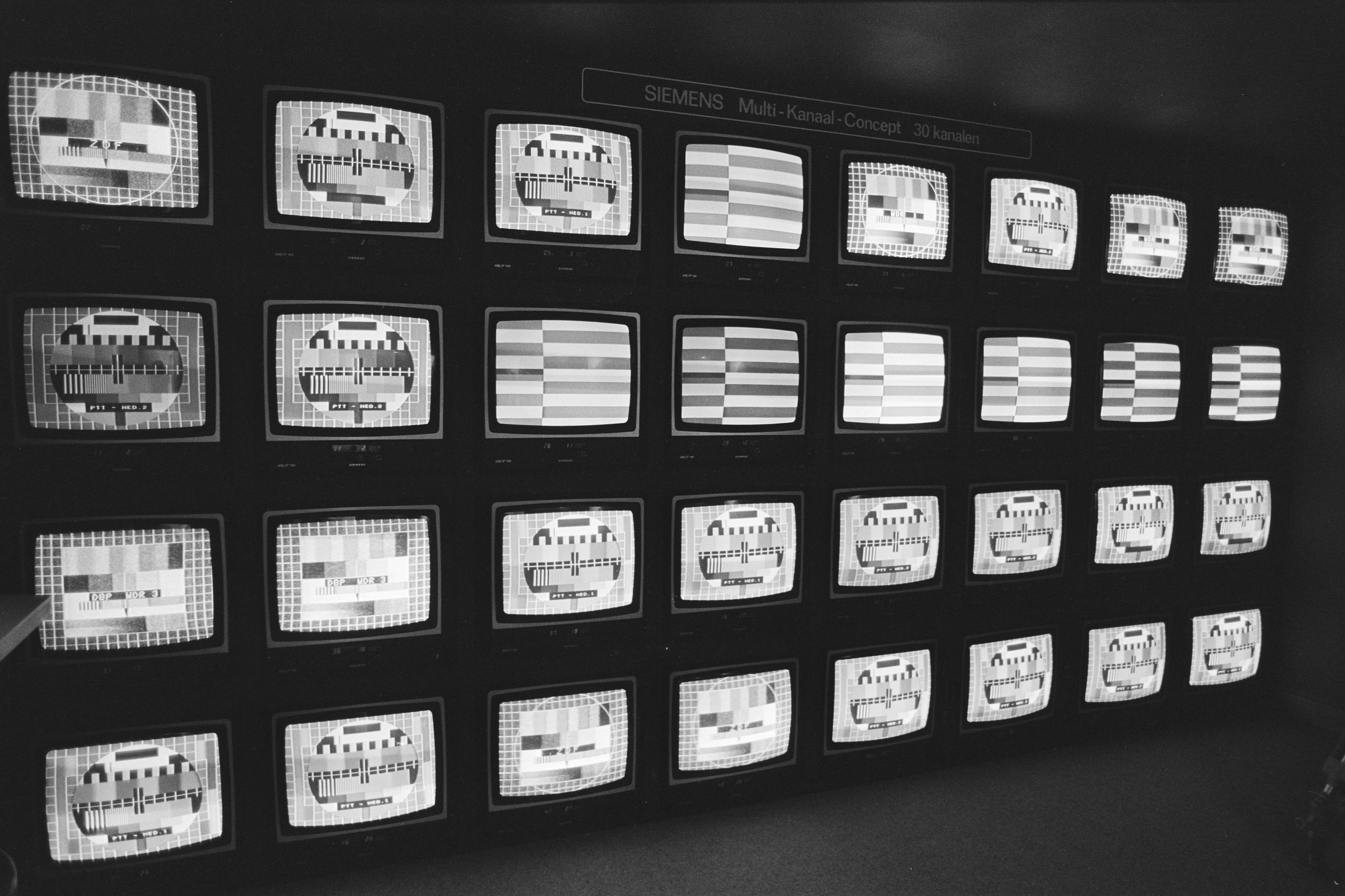
Philips circle pattern and Telefunken FuBK test cards in a Dutch cable TV demonstration in March 1981.

In Denmark, where the Philips circle pattern was invented, it was used by its national broadcaster Danmarks Radio (DR) from its launch of regular colour broadcasts in 1970, immediately replacing Test Card F and Philips PM5552, and later on the monochrome Pye Test Card G and Philips PM5540; as well as its first nationwide commercial channel TV 2 during its pre-launch tests and its downtime hours and subsequently also on most of the latter's regional and themed channels. DR, TV 2 and TV 2 Film also later used the widescreen Philips circle pattern for widescreen broadcasts from the 1990s. In Greenland, the standard and widescreen Philips circle pattern are used by its public broadcaster Kalaallit Nunaata Radioa (KNR) from its launch of television services in 1982. A modified variant of the widescreen Philips circle pattern is used by the Faroese public broadcaster Kringvarp Føroya (KvF) alongside the EBU colour bars during off-air hours.

In the Netherlands, where Philips is headquartered, the Philips circle pattern began to be used by the Staatsbedrijf der Posterijen, Telegrafie en Telefonie (Dutch PTT agency) for the benefit of the television trade from 1 January 1974, alternating with colour test slides. Nozema, the operator of all national radio and television broadcasting infrastructure in the Netherlands, also used the Philips circle pattern. From 1 March 1975, the Dutch public broadcasting system also started to use the Philips circle pattern on its TV channels, replacing the monochrome RMA 1946 Resolution Chart, the electronic monochrome chequerboard test card generated by a Philips GM 2671/50 video signal generator, the Philips PM5552 early colour test card, and after the late-1980s, the EBU electronic monochrome test pattern and the Philips PM5540 monochrome test card. From the 1980s until the end of all public test card transmissions in the Netherlands in December 2004, the Philips circle pattern (in both standard and widescreen formats) also alternated with Telefunken FuBK during downtime on the Dutch public TV channels. However, Ziggo, the largest cable television provider in the Netherlands, still offers the widescreen Philips circle pattern on channel 997.

The BBC in the United Kingdom occasionally used a slightly modified version of the Philips circle pattern called Test Card G from 1971 until the late-1990s, in conjunction with Test Card F. The Independent Broadcasting Authority (IBA) initially used this card in the 1970s, also in conjunction with Test Card F and EBU colour bars, but eventually abandoned Test Card G and developed a unique test card called the ETP-1, which was brought into use on ITV from 1979 onwards. However, London Weekend Television (LWT) and ITV Channel Television, two constituent franchisee companies in the ITV network structure, continued to use Test Card G well into the 1980s. Test Card G was also used on BFBS/SSVC Television's low-powered terrestrial broadcasts serving British Armed Forces personnel in West Germany and West Berlin in the 1980s and 1990s. A modified version of Test Card G was also briefly used on Sky One alongside the Simplified Telefunken FuBK pattern in the early-1990s.

The Philips circle pattern was also used by Raidió Teilifís Éireann (RTÉ) in the Republic of Ireland (in conjunction with a modified version of the EBU colour bars shown after the Irish national anthem was played at closedown) from the start of its regular colour broadcasts in 1972 until they were replaced by RTÉ Aertel overnight in-vision teletext in mid-1996.

In the DACH countries, the Philips circle pattern was used by the German commercial terrestrial channel RTL and the German public-service channel Phoenix. The Austrian public broadcaster ORF used a slightly modified version of the Philips circle pattern. Use of the Philips circle pattern in the DACH was solely confined to these broadcasters, as most TV stations in these areas instead preferred to use the Telefunken FuBK test card when they adopted colour television.

In Italy, its national broadcaster RAI introduced the Philips circle pattern in 1977 at the same time as it launched its first regular colour broadcasts, replacing heavily modified versions of the Indian-head test pattern. Later on, RAI then used the 1990s widescreen variation for PALplus broadcasts. Telefriuli also used a heavily modified version of the PM5544 in the 1980s.

In Spain, the Philips circle pattern was introduced by the various autonomous and private channels in the early-1980s notably by TV3, El 33, Telemadrid, Antena 3, EITB and Canal+ Spain, as well as on point-to-point terrestrial and satellite links operated by Retevisión and Telefónica Sistemas de Satélites. Spain's national public broadcaster TVE however instead primarily used its own TVE colour test card from 1975 until the mid-2000s, although in the 1990s it did also briefly used the widescreen PM5644 circle pattern.

In Iceland, the 4:3 Philips circle pattern was used by its national broadcaster RÚV from its launch of colour broadcasts in 1973–76, only fully replacing its heavily modified monochrome Philips PM5540 test card after 1982. RÚV subsequently replaced its aforementioned 4:3 pattern with a widescreen Philips circle pattern in 2009, then discontinued all their on-air test card broadcasts in 2011. However, the privately owned subscription channels Stöð 2, launched in 1986, and Sjónvarp Símans, launched in 1999, opted not to use the Philips circle pattern.

In the former SFR Yugoslavia, the Philips circle pattern was used by its national broadcaster Yugoslav Radio Television (JRT) in conjunction with the Telefunken FuBK test card. Use of the PM5544 continued for some time afterwards in some of its constituent successor countries.

In Bulgaria, the privately owned nationwide broadcaster bTV introduced the Philips circle pattern in November 2000 with the start of its new program schedules, replacing the EBU colour bars, used from its launch on 1 June 2000. Use of the Philips circle pattern was in its test card broadcasts until 17 February 2001 between 12:00 AM and 06:00 AM (the next day, bTV started 24-hour transmissions), and 2 times a year during transmitter maintenance until 2013.

The Philips circle pattern was also used in Hungary, Belgium, Norway, and Sweden.

==== South America ====
In Argentina, the Philips circle pattern was used by América TV, El Nueve and El Trece from the start of their color transmissions in 1980.

=== SECAM broadcasts ===
SECAM users of the Philips circle pattern included TDF (TF1, Antenne 2, FR3, Canal+, La Cinquième and M6) in France, Télé Sahel in Niger, Iraqi TV in Iraq, VTV in Vietnam and SNRT in Morocco. ERT in Greece and TVP in Poland started using the PM5544 for SECAM transmissions since the 1970s and continued using it after switching to PAL in the 1990s.

=== NTSC broadcasts ===
NTSC users of the Philips circle pattern included CBFT and CBMT in Quebec, Canada, WBOY-TV and WNYW in the United States, DZBB-TV in the Philippines, Myawaddy TV in Myanmar, KBS and MBC in South Korea, TTV, CTV, CTS and FTV in Taiwan and RTNH in Haiti. The Japanese national broadcaster, NHK, also used a 525-line version of the test card, albeit with slight technical differences as compared to those used by the American and Canadian broadcasters so as to conform with the NTSC-J system.

=== Usage gallery ===
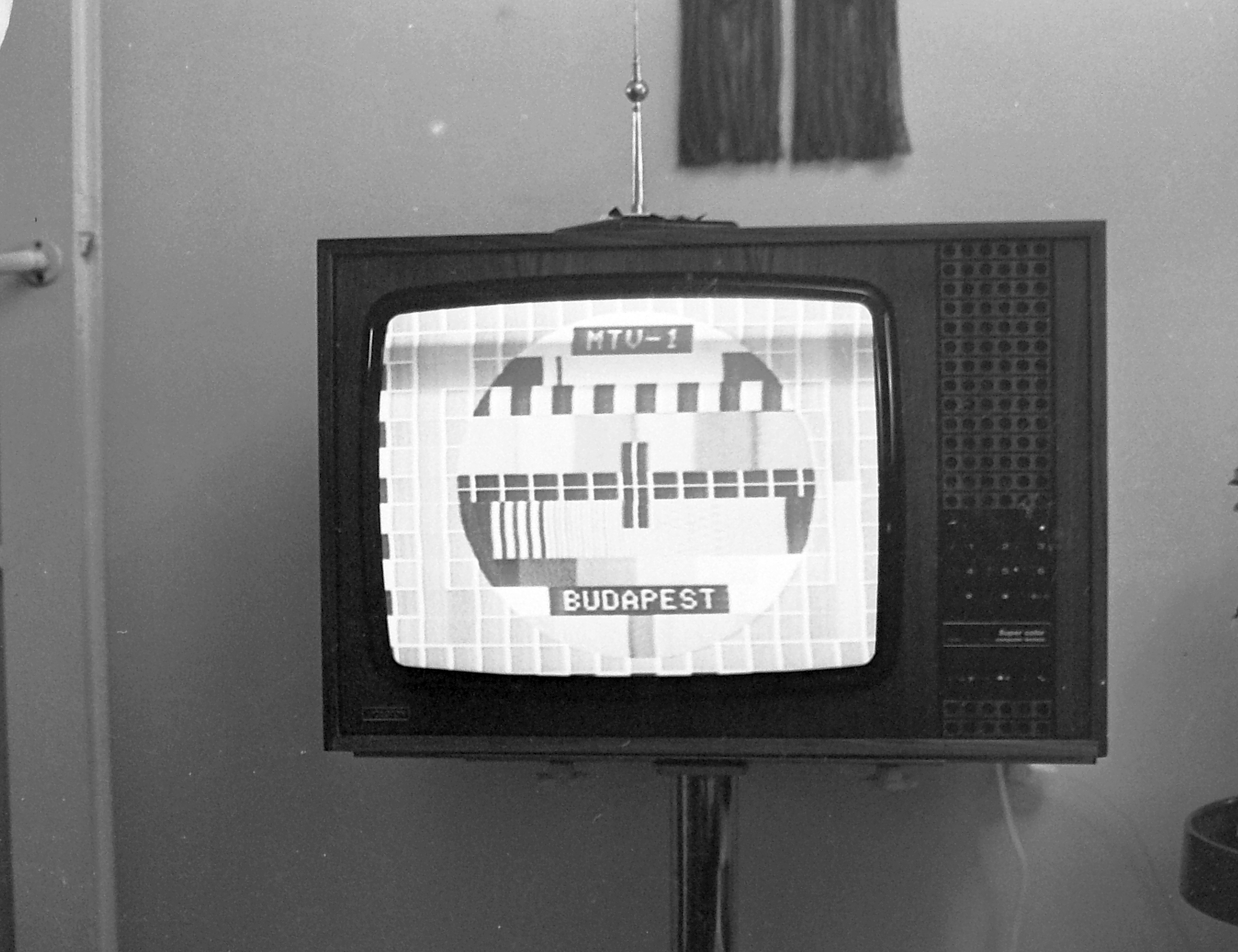
MTV-1 (Budapest) broadcasting the Philips circle pattern in 1980.

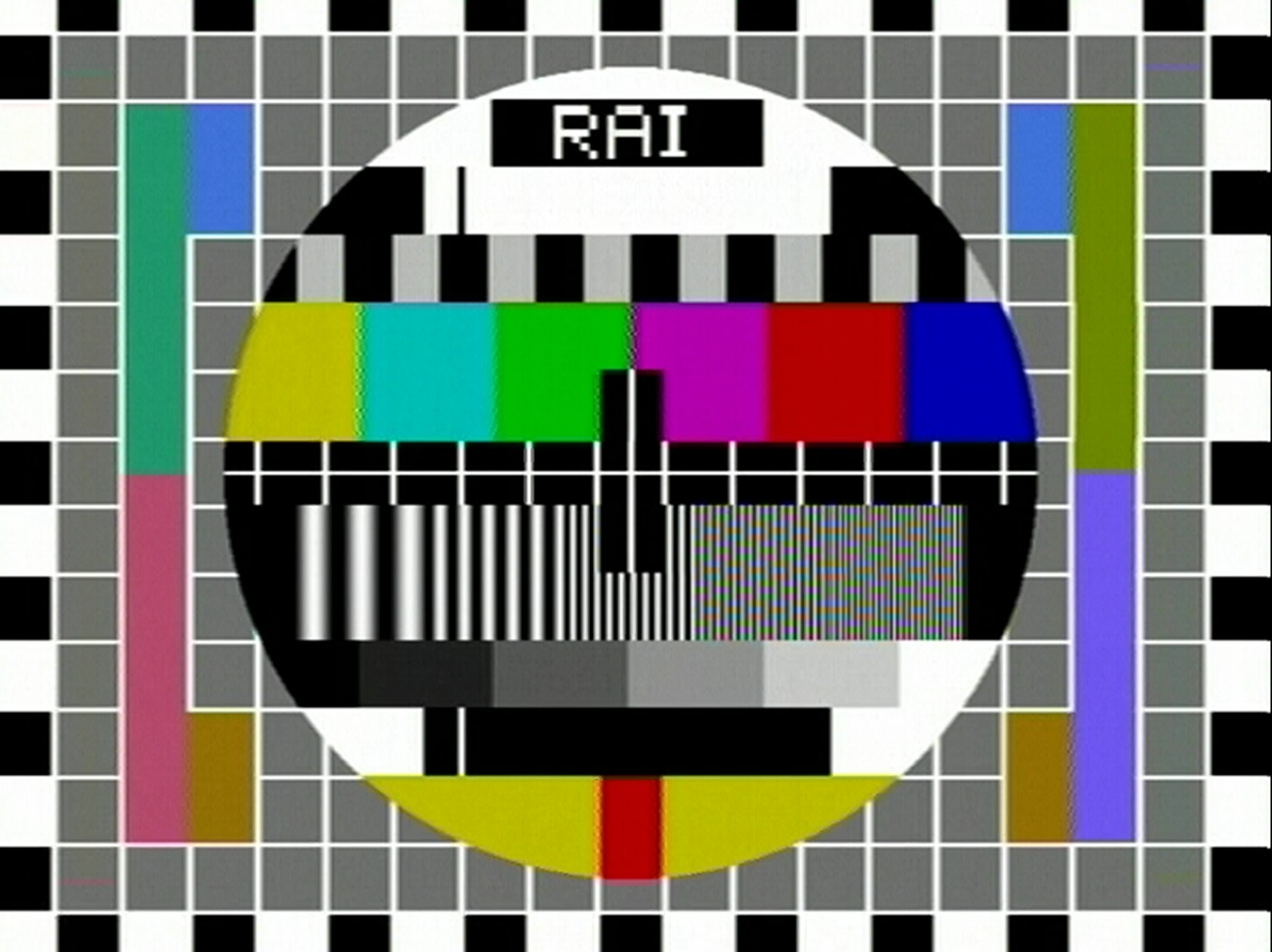
Off-air screen capture of the RAI PAL circle pattern, with dot crawl.

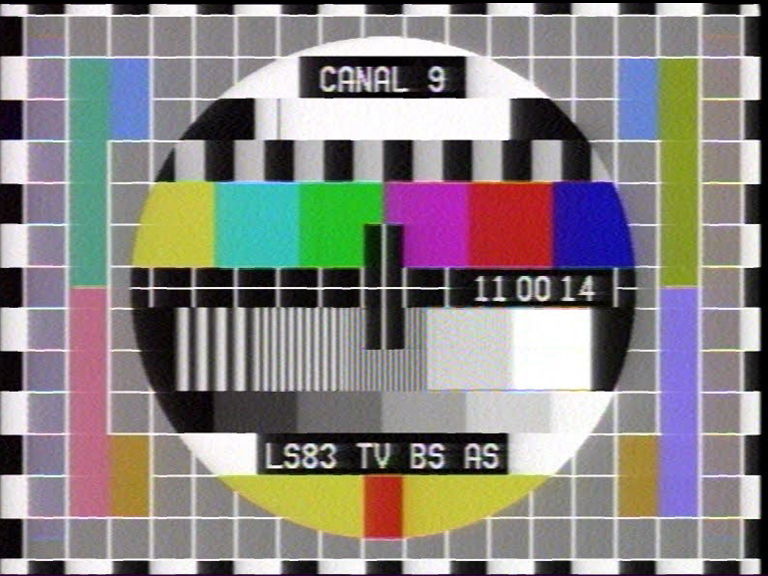
Off-air screen capture of a Canal 9 Argentina PAL circle pattern with clock cutout (PM5534), transmitted in 1984.

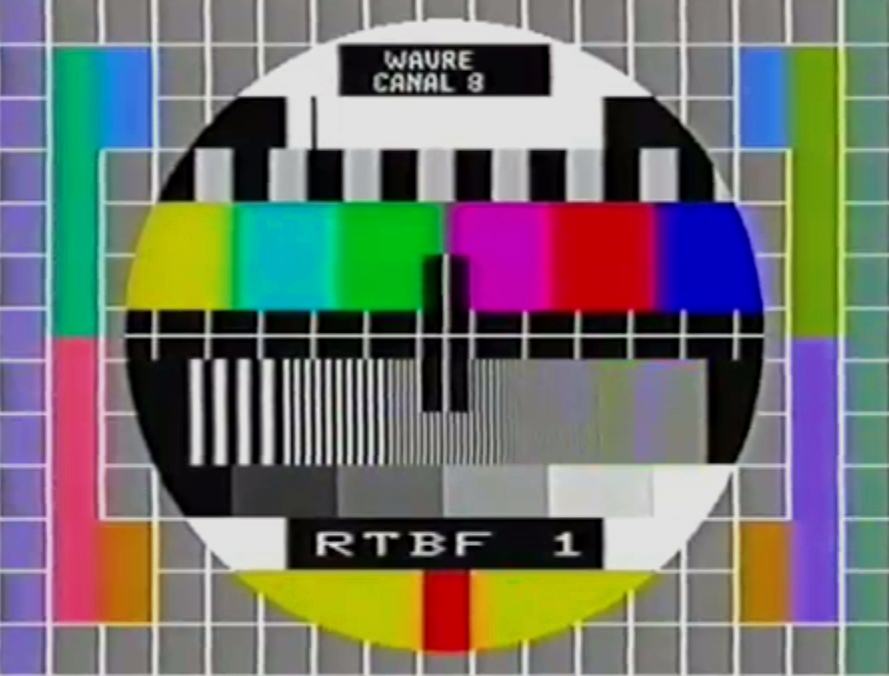
Off-air screen capture of a RTBF La Une PAL circle pattern (with border castellations cropped) transmitted from the Wavre transmitter in 1987.

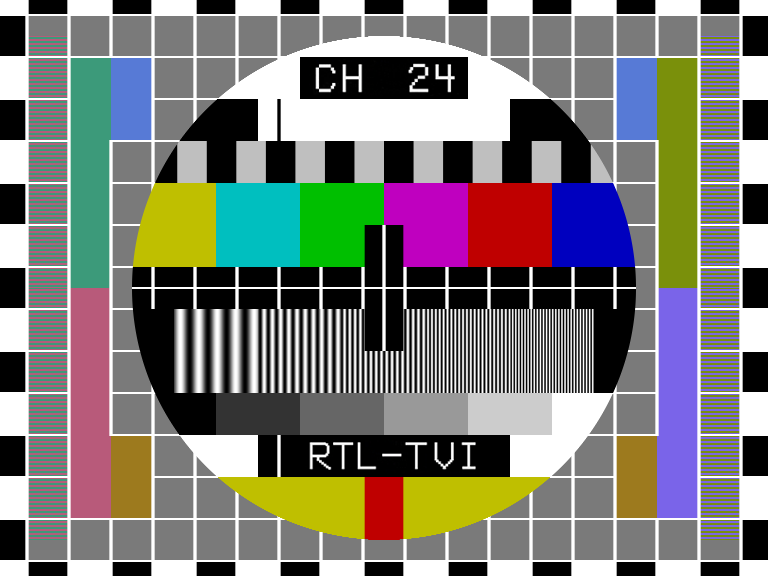
Recreation of the RTL-TVI PAL circle pattern (with border castellations cropped) transmitted from the Dudelange transmitter in Luxembourg to the French Community of Belgium.

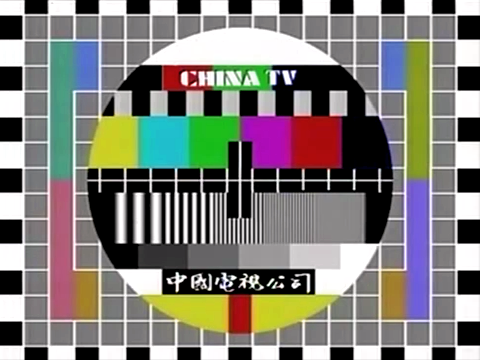
Off-air screen capture of an NTSC circle pattern used by China TV in Taiwan from the 1990s–2008.

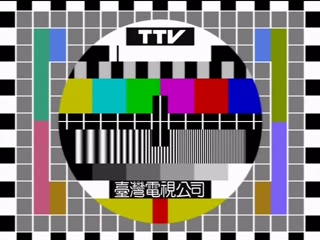
Off-air screen capture of a PT5230 (in NTSC mode) used by Taiwan TV transmitted in February 2014.

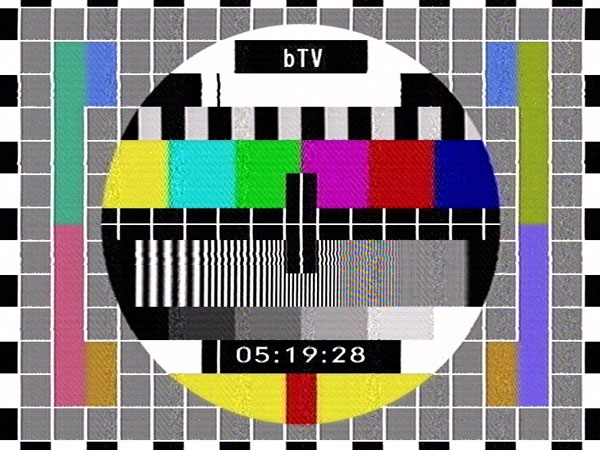
Off-air screen capture of PAL Philips circle pattern used by bTV transmitted with a digital clock between 2000 and 2002.

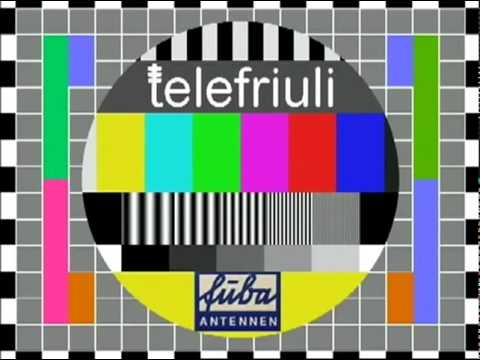
Off-air screen capture of Telefriuli variant.

== See also ==
- Hanover bars
- TVE test card
- Philips PM5540
- Telefunken FuBK
- ETP-1
