= EBU colour bars =

Television test card

EBU/IBA 100/0/75/0 Colour Bars Displayed colours are only approximate due to different transfer and colour spaces used on web pages (sRGB) and video (BT.601 or BT.709)

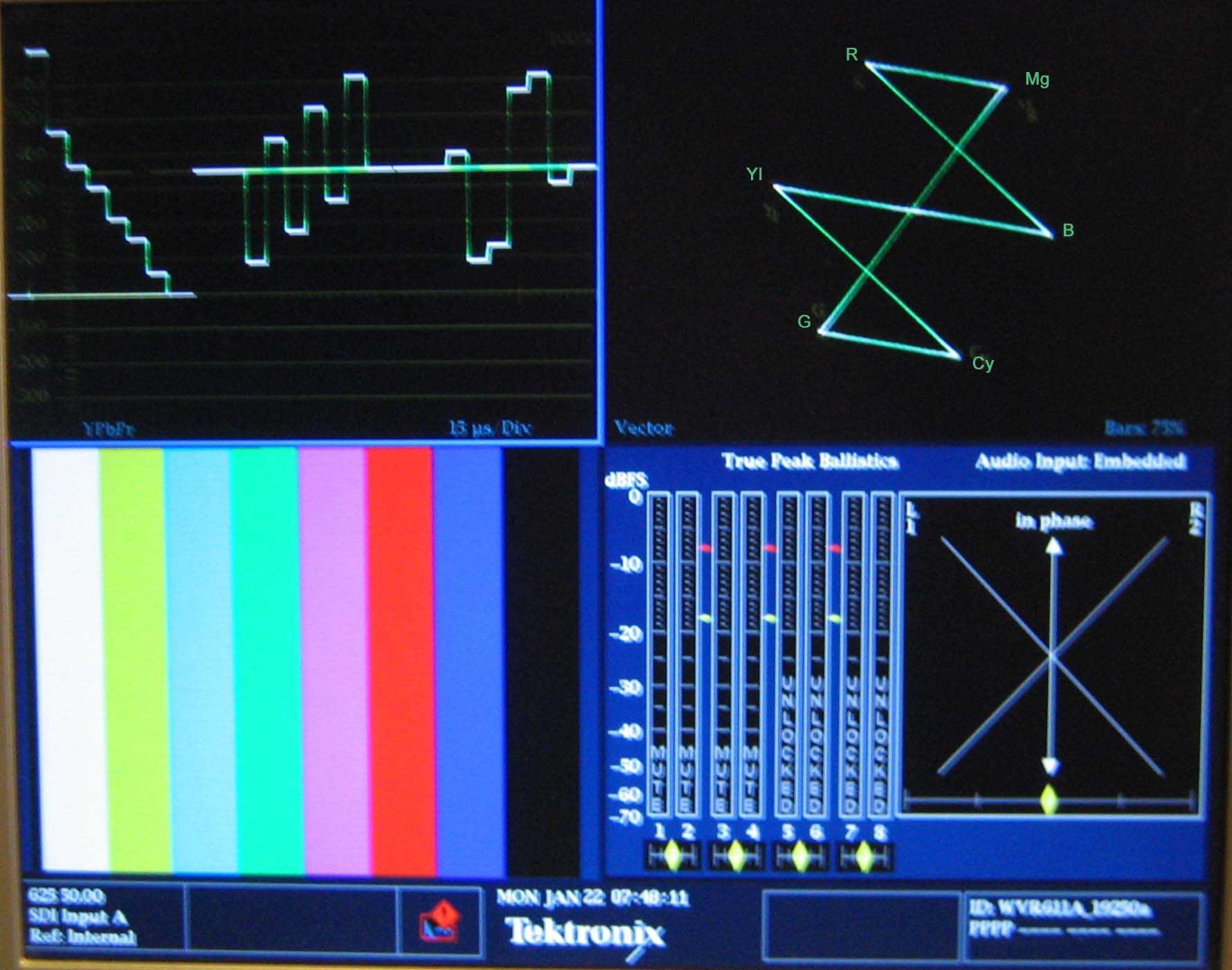
EBU Colour Bars as displayed on a Tektronix waveform monitor and vectorscope

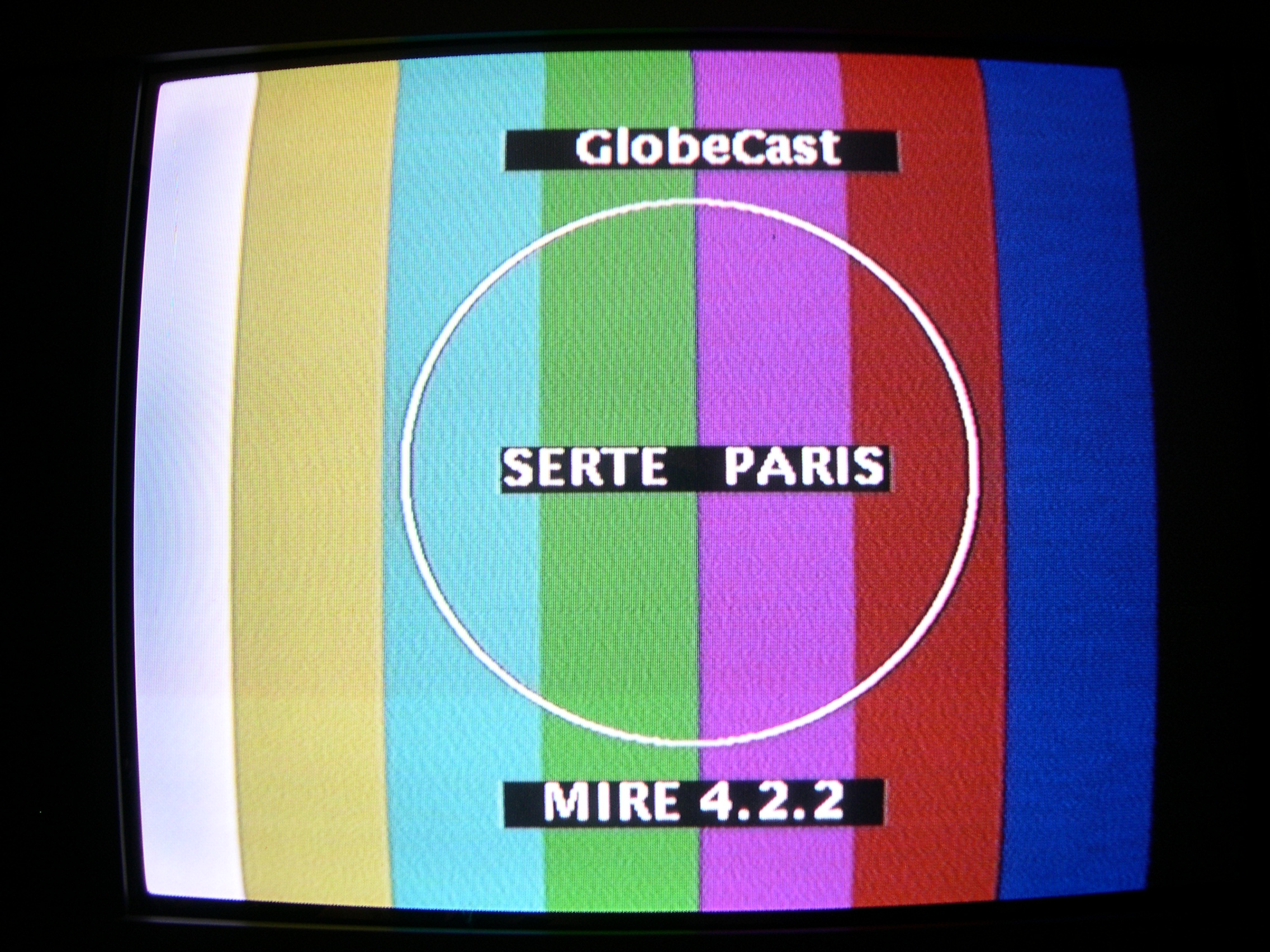
EBU Colour Bars transmitted from a digital point-to-point satellite link (DVB-S) operated by Globecast

The EBU colour bars are a television test card used to check if a video signal has been altered by recording or transmission, and what adjustments must be made to bring it back to specification. It is also used for setting a television monitor or receiver to reproduce chrominance and luminance information correctly. The EBU bars are most commonly shown arranged side-by-side in a vertical manner (as in the images in this article), though some broadcasters – such as TVP in Poland, and Gabon Télévision in Gabon – were known to have aired a horizontal version of the EBU bars.

It is similar to the SMPTE color bars, although that pattern is typically associated with the NTSC analogue colour TV system. Many test cards, such as Philips PM5544 or Telefunken FuBK, feature elements equivalent to the EBU colour bars.

== 75% Colour Bars ==
EBU 75/0/75/0 Colour Bars pattern Displayed colours are only approximate due to different transfer and colour spaces used on web pages (sRGB) and video (BT.601 or BT.709)

The 75% Colour Bars or EBU/IBA 100/0/75/0 Colour Bars pattern is very similar to the SMPTE colour bars pattern, although it only features seven colour bars, and the white bar is at 100% intensity.

There is a variant where the white bar is also at 75% intensity (EBU 75/0/75/0). This pattern is generated by certain types of test equipment – including the Philips PM5519.

The signal values of these bars for the PAL analogue system are:

| | Luminance | Chroma amplitude | Chroma Φ |
|---|---|---|---|
| White 100/0/75/0 | 1.00 | – | – |
| White 75/0/75/0 | 0.75 | – | – |
| Yellow | 0.67 | 0.33 | 167º |
| Cyan | 0.53 | 0.47 | 283º |
| Green | 0.44 | 0.44 | 241º |
| Magenta | 0.31 | 0.44 | 61º |
| Red | 0.23 | 0.47 | 103º |
| Blue | 0.08 | 0.33 | 347º |
| Black | 0 | – | – |

Displayed colours are converted from the original PAL BT.601 colour space to sRGB – the colour space used on web pages. They are only approximate, giving a notion of how the bars would look on a calibrated PAL display.

== 100% Colour Bars ==
EBU 100/0/100/0 Colour Bars Displayed colours are only approximate due to different transfer and colour spaces used on web pages (sRGB) and video (BT.601 or BT.709)

An alternate form of colour bars is the 100% Colour Bars or EBU 100/0/100/0 Colour Bars pattern (specified in ITU-R Rec. BT.1729), also known as the RGB pattern or full field bars, which consists of eight vertical bars of 100% intensity, and does not include the castellation or luminance patterns. Like the SMPTE colour bars pattern, the colour order is white, yellow, cyan, green, magenta, red, and blue – but with an additional column of saturated black. This pattern is used to check peak colour levels, and colour saturation, as well as colour alignment. The 100% pattern is not as common as the SMPTE bars, or the above-mentioned EBU 75% pattern, but many pieces of test equipment can be selected to generate either one. Many professional cameras can be set to generate a 100% pattern for calibration of broadcast or recording equipment, especially in a multi-camera installation where all camera signals must match.

=== Standard Definition ===
EBU colour bar values for standard-definition television systems following BT.601, as specified in ITU-R Rec. BT.1729:

10-bit digital YCbCr values for 100/0/100/0 bars on SD systems
| | Y | Cb | Cr |
|---|---|---|---|
| White | 940 | 512 | 512 |
| Yellow | 840 | 64 | 585 |
| Cyan | 678 | 663 | 64 |
| Green | 578 | 215 | 137 |
| Magenta | 426 | 809 | 887 |
| Red | 326 | 361 | 960 |
| Blue | 164 | 960 | 439 |
| Black | 64 | 512 | 512 |

Displayed colours are converted from the original PAL BT.601 colour space to sRGB – the colour space used on web pages. They are only approximate, but represent what is seen on a properly calibrated display using the original colour space.

Calculation of $Y$ (luminance) and $C_B C_R$ (colour difference) signals from $R'$, $G'$ and $B'$ components according to BT.601 is as follows:

$$\begin{align}
Y' &=  0.299  \cdot R' + 0.587  \cdot G' + 0.114  \cdot B'\\
C_B ' &=  0.564 \cdot (B' - Y')\\
C_R ' &=  0.713 \cdot (R' - Y')\\
\end{align}$$

=== High Definition ===
EBU colour bar values for high definition TV systems following BT.709, as specified in ITU-R Rec. BT.1729:

10-bit digital YCbCr values for 100/0/100/0 bars on HD systems
| | Y | Cb | Cr |
|---|---|---|---|
| White | 940 | 512 | 512 |
| Yellow | 877 | 64 | 553 |
| Cyan | 754 | 615 | 64 |
| Green | 691 | 167 | 105 |
| Magenta | 313 | 857 | 919 |
| Red | 250 | 409 | 960 |
| Blue | 127 | 960 | 471 |
| Black | 64 | 512 | 512 |

Calculation of $Y$ (luminance) and $C_B C_R$ (colour difference) signals from $R'$, $G'$ and $B'$ components according to BT.709 is as follows:

$$\begin{align}
Y' &=  0.2126  \cdot R' + 0.7152  \cdot G' + 0.0722  \cdot B'\\
C_B ' &=  (B' - Y') / 1.8556\\
C_R ' &=  (R' - Y') / 1.5748\\
\end{align}$$

== HDR UHDTV ==
In 2020 the EBU published a newer colour bar pattern named Colour Bars for Use in the Production of Hybrid Log Gamma (HDR) UHDTV, designed for HDR broadcasts, taking into account the extended colour gamut of these systems. It includes 100% and 75% ITU-R BT.2100 HLG colour bars, and colour bars which can be converted to ITU-R BT.709 75% bars when scene-light and display-light mathematical transforms defined in ITU-R BT.2408 are used.

This pattern allows testing of UHDTV to HDTV conversion, measuring luminance response, saturation and hue shifts, and checking near‑black performance. It can also be used to check for correct hardware settings, transmission chain errors, and proper colour space transforms from ITU‑R BT.2100 HLG to ITU‑R BT.709. Versions of the pattern are freely available as a still image or video file.

The pattern is similar to the ITU-R recommendation BT.2111 that also covers the PQ transfer function. Another similar pattern named Colour Bar Test Pattern for Hybrid Log-Gamma (HLG) High Dynamic Range Television (HDR-TV) System was developed by ARIB in 2018 (ARIB STD-B72), based on the SMPTE color bars commonly used in Japan and United States.

== See also ==
- SMPTE color bars
- Indian-head test pattern
- Test Card F
- TEA1002
- Philips PM5544
- Telefunken FuBK
