= Canal Clásico =

Spanish television channel

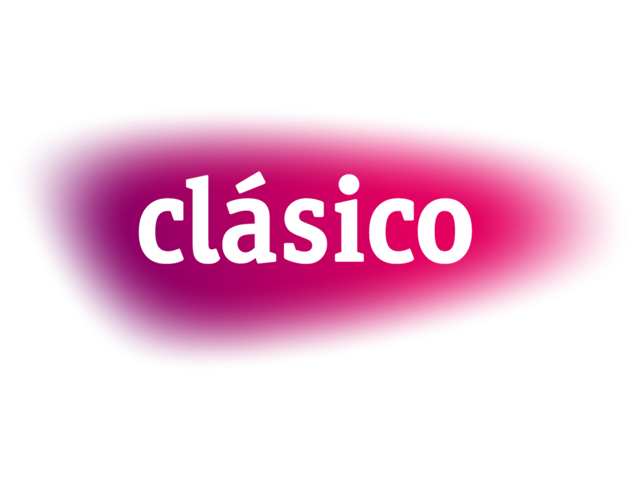
- Country: Spain

Programming
- Picture format: 576i (4:3 SDTV)

Ownership
- Owner: TVE
- Sister channels: La 1 La 2 Clan; Cultural·es; 24h Teledeporte; TVE Internacional

History
- Launched: 8 January 1994; 32 years ago
- Closed: 10 September 2010; 15 years ago

Links
- Website: Official Site

Canal Clásico (lit. transl. "Classical Channel") was a Spanish television channel owned and operated by Televisión Española (TVE), the television division of state-owned public broadcaster Radiotelevisión Española (RTVE). It was available via pay television platform Digital+, and previously on Cotelsat. It was known for broadcasting a range of classical music as well as dance and operas.

It was launched on 8 January 1994 and discontinued on 10 September 2010.

== Programming ==
The channel broadcast a range of classical music as well as dance and operas. The network based its schedule on different types of programming for each day of the week:
Monday
Musical cinema and documentaries
Tuesday
Ballet and Contemporary Dance
Wednesday
Chamber music including choirs and solo performers
Thursday
Music from well known composers
Friday
Other types of music like New Age and ethnic music
Saturday
Opera and large concerts
Sunday
Flamenco.

== Logos and identities ==
Original Canal Clasico logo. Used from the 1990s
