= Clan (TV channel) =

Public Spanish children's television network

Clan Clan Internacional
- Country: Spain
- Broadcast area: Spain
- Network: Televisión Española (TVE)
- Headquarters: Prado del Rey, Pozuelo de Alarcón (Madrid)

Programming
- Languages: Spanish, English (via SAP)
- Picture format: 1080i HDTV

Ownership
- Owner: Radiotelevisión Española (RTVE)
- Sister channels: La 1 La 2; 24 Horas; Teledeporte; TVE Internacional; Star TVE HD

History
- Launched: 12 December 2005; 20 years ago
- Replaced: TVE 50 Años (evenings)

Links
- Website: http://www.rtve.es/infantil/

Availability

Terrestrial
- Digital terrestrial: Physical channels varies by province.

Clan is a Spanish free-to-air television channel owned and operated by Televisión Española (TVE), the television division of state-owned public broadcaster Radiotelevisión Española (RTVE). It is the corporation's television channel for kids, and is known for its programming for children between the ages of two and twelve.

Logo used from 2008 to 2026

== History ==
It was launched on 12 December 2005 and until 1 January 2007 it had time-shared with TVE 50 Años between 9pm and 7am, which has since closed. The service since then broadcasts 24 hours a day.

Clan is available free on digital terrestrial television (known as TDT in Spain) and on major subscription platforms. In the United States, the channel is available on Dish Network. Although the channel primarily screens programming for children aged from two to twelve, programming for older audiences is shown during the evening and night. A mixture of Spanish and foreign programming is shown, all in the Spanish language, both live-action and animated. Some programs feature a sign-language interpreter as well. Because of this, the channel is regarded as a useful platform for primary school teachers. Musical programs such as Operacion Triunfo, the Eurovision Song Contest and Junior Eurovision Song Contest are also broadcast on the channel.

In 2010, the channel started promoting internet safety to children.

An international feed started broadcasting in Latin America and the United States in 2017.

In December 2023, the channel acquired the rights to H2O: Just Add Water and its sequel spin-off Mako: Island of Secrets. RTVE paid producer-distributor ZDF Studios a sum of €280,900 to air the two series.

On January 30, 2025, it was announced that before the end of the year, the channel will start broadcasting its content in Basque, Catalan and Galician too. The Catalan audio track was originally scheduled to arrive in the fall, but it was later postponed to spring 2026. On October 31, 2025, a Disney Jr. branded block launched on the channel, running twice every day.

From November 5, 2026, the channel will move to the RGE1 multiplex. Since that multiplex enables regional opt-outs, RTVE will have to notify operator Cellnex to enable it two or three weeks after the new configuration is in place. This will finally enable region-specific programming for Catalonia, Galicia and the Basque Country, in their respective languages.

== Derived programs and products ==
=== Revista Clan ===
Revista Clan was published for the first time on March 25, 2010, a monthly magazine released at a national scale. The magazine is aimed at children between ages 3 and 10.

=== Let's Clan ===
In September 2013, TVE launched Let’s Clan, a slot with series in English supported by the British Council. Its goal is to stimulate the learning of the language among children.
