= Philips PM5540 =

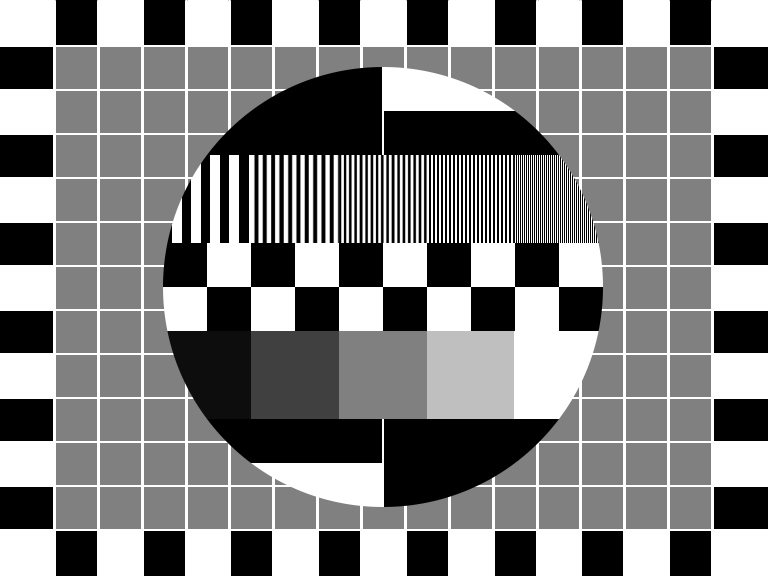
Recreation of PM 5540 Philips test pattern

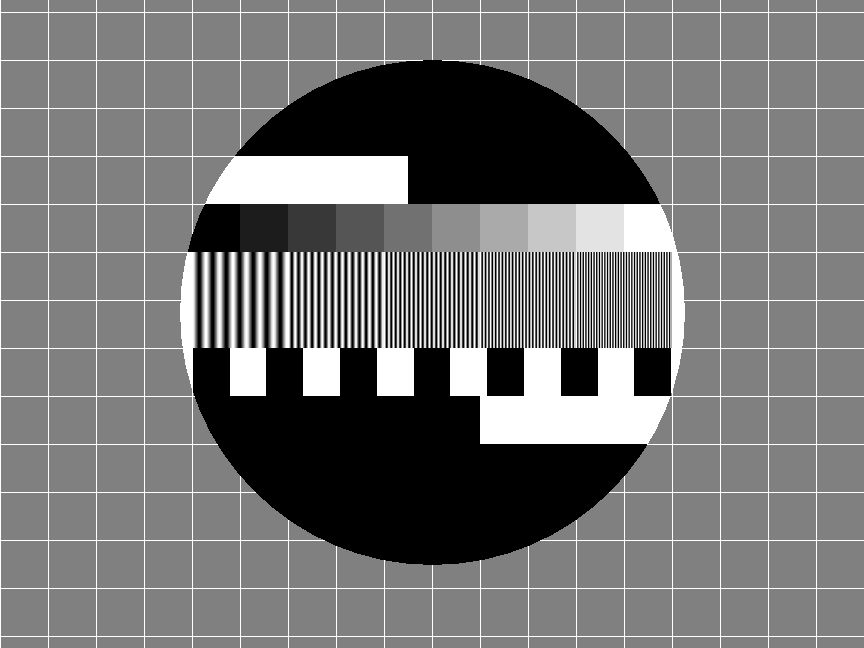
Recreation of the PM5540 variant used by Sjónvarpið/RÚV

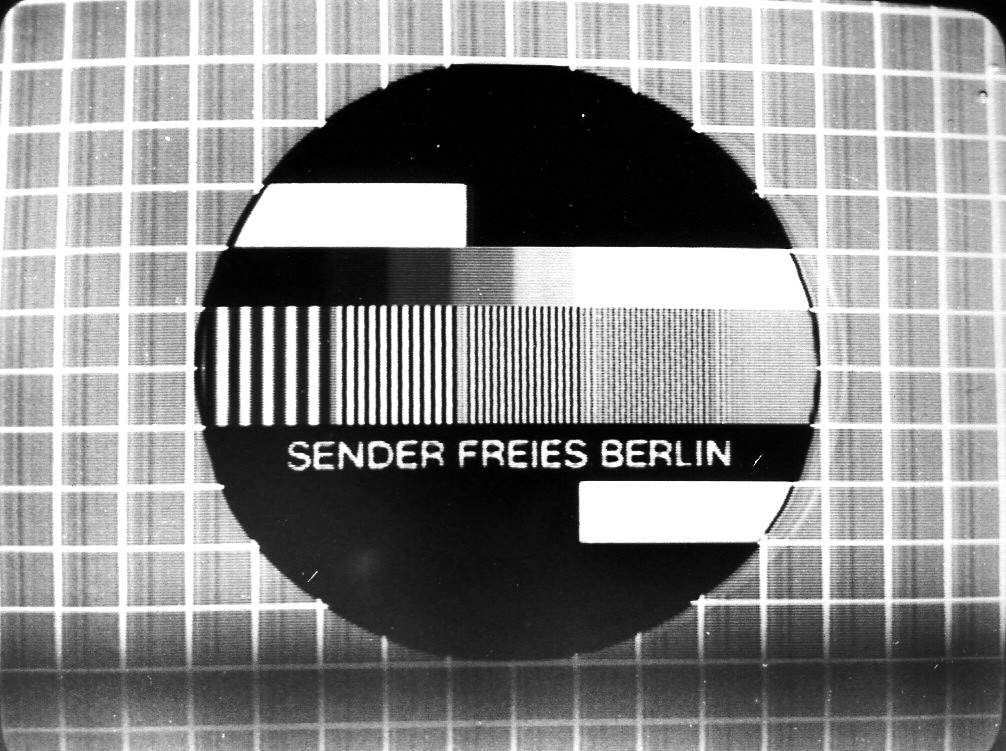
Off-air photo of PM5540 variant used by SDR, SWF, SFB and Sjónvarpið/RÚV.

The Philips PM5540 was an early electronic video signal generator, which generated a monochrome test card that is considered to be a black-and-white predecessor of the widely used Philips PM5544 and the latter's related family of Philips circle test patterns. The content and layout of the pattern, as well as the generator, was designed and made by Danish engineer Finn Hendil (1939–2011) at the Philips TV & Test Equipment laboratory in Amager, south of Copenhagen in 1965–66.

It has been used in Australia, Spain, United Arab Emirates, Denmark, Israel, Qatar, and the Netherlands.

A heavily modified variant of the PM5540 test card (absence of border castellations and other modifications) was used by Sjónvarpið/RÚV of Iceland from 1966 until 1982, and by three regional broadcasters of the German public broadcasting corporation ARD (Sender Freies Berlin, Süddeutscher Rundfunk and Südwestfunk).

Some features of the main test card:

- Background - grid of 14 x 10 squares, each square with a white border 2 raster scan lines thick;
- Black and white squares - around the borders, with the four corners being white;
- Circle - has a diameter of 440 scan lines;
- Definition lines - gratings corresponding to 0.8, 1.8, 2.8, 3.8 and 4.8 MHz, allowing measurement of image bandwidth and associated horizontal resolution;
- Staircase - grayscale linear gradation in 5 steps;
- Background - uniform 50% lightness grey background;
- Needle pulse - white pulse on black background;

Besides the main "Complete Pattern", the hardware was capable of generating other patterns named as "Crossed Lines", "Black/White Steps", "Definition Lines", "Sawtooth", "Vertical Bars" and "Blank Pattern".
