= Teledeporte =

Public Spanish sports television network

- Country: Spain
- Broadcast area: Spain and Andorra, reaching bordering regions via overspill of the Spanish terrestrial network
- Network: Televisión Española (TVE)
- Headquarters: Sant Cugat del Vallès and Torrespaña

Programming
- Language: Spanish
- Picture format: 1080i HDTV

Ownership
- Owner: Radiotelevisión Española (RTVE)
- Sister channels: La 1 La 2 Clan; 24h TVE Internacional; Star TVE

History
- Launched: 12 February 1994; 32 years ago
- Former names: TVE Deportes

Links
- Website: rtve.es/deportes

Teledeporte (TDP) is a Spanish free-to-air television channel owned and operated by Televisión Española (TVE), the television division of state-owned public broadcaster Radiotelevisión Española (RTVE). It is the corporation's sports television channel, and is known for live broadcast of major Spanish and international sporting events.

It was launched on 12 February 1994 through Hispasat satellite, and was the second sports channel launched in Spain, after Eurosport.

== History ==
The channel started broadcasting on 12 February 1994 as a temporary free-to-air channel to cover the 1994 Winter Olympics. The channel was distributed using the Cotelsat service on one of the two channels granted to TVE (the other being Canal Clásico). Full-time broadcasts started on 4 April (originally scheduled for 1 April).

== Broadcast rights ==
=== National tournaments ===
- Field hockey
  - Liga de Hockey Hierba
  - Copa del Rey
  - Copa de la Reina de Hockey Hierba
- Road cycling
  - Spanish National Road Race Championships
- Rugby union
  - División de Honor de Rugby
  - Copa del Rey
- Tennis
  - Spanish National Tennis Masters
- Volleyball
  - Copa del Rey
  - Copa de la Reina
- Water polo
  - Liga Española
  - Copa del Rey
  - Copa de la Reina

=== International events ===
Olympic Games

- Summer Olympics
- Winter Olympics

World championships

- World Athletics Championships
- FINA World Aquatics Championships
- UCI Road World Championships
- World Gymnastics Championships
- World Men's Handball Championship
- Hockey World Cup
- FIS Alpine Ski World Cup
- FIS Alpine World Ski Championships
- FIVB Beach Volleyball World Championships
- FIVB Volleyball World Championship

European championships

- European Athletics Championships
- European Aquatics Championships
- European Men's Artistic Gymnastics Championships
- European Women's Artistic Gymnastics Championships
- European Men's Artistic Gymnastics Championships
- European Men's Handball Championship
- European Women's Handball Championship
- EuroHockey Nations Championship
- Men's European Volleyball Championship
- Women's European Volleyball Championship
- European Water Polo Championship

International club competitions

- EuroCup Basketball
- Euro Hockey League
- EHF Champions League
- LEN Champions League

Tennis events

- ATP Tour (Madrid Barcelona and Mallorca tournaments only)
- WTA Tour
- Billie Jean King Cup

Road cycling events

- Vuelta a España
- Tour de France
- Giro d'Italia

Motor race events

- Dakar Rally
- W Series
- F4 Spanish Championship
- Formula One
- F1 Academy
- Superbike World Championship
- Grand Prix motorcycle racing
