= Broadcast-safe =

Technical term in broadcast industry

Broadcast-safe video (broadcast legal or legal signal) is a term used in the broadcast industry to define video and audio compliant with the technical or regulatory broadcast requirements of the target area or region the feed might be broadcasting to. In the United States, the Federal Communications Commission (FCC) is the regulatory authority; in most of Europe, standards are set by the European Broadcasting Union (EBU).

== Broadcast-safe video ==
=== Broadcast-safe standard-definition video ===
==== Broadcast-safe 625 video ====
Broadcast-safe standards for 625 lines of standard-definition (inaccurately referred to as PAL, a colour encoding that is usually used with such systems) video are:

- Common name = 625/50i (576i)
- Commonly used digital SD SDI baseband signal = SMPTE 259M-C, 270 Mbit/s bitrate
- Commonly used number of vertical lines = 625 (576 visible active video)
- Commonly used frame rate = 25 Hz (25 interlaced frame/s)
- Commonly used TV resolution = 720 × 576 (576i)
- Black levels = 0 mV or 0 IRE
- White levels (chrominance amplitude):
  - 700 mV p-p or 100 IRE – 100% intensity setting which corresponds to 100.0.100.0 SMPTE color bars.
  - 75% intensity corresponding to 100.0.75.0 color bars, also referred to as EBU bars.

===== Variants =====
Resolution		Aspect ratio	Pixel aspect ratio	Form of scanning	Framerate (Hz)
Vertical	Horizontal	Aspect ratio	Pixel aspect ratio	Form of scanning	Framerate (Hz)
576	352	4:3 or 16:9	non-square	interlaced	25 (50 fields/s)
576	352	4:3 or 16:9	non-square	progressive	25
576	480	4:3 or 16:9	non-square	interlaced	25 (50 fields/s)
576	480	4:3 or 16:9	non-square	progressive	25
576	544	4:3 or 16:9	non-square	interlaced	25 (50 fields/s)
576	544	4:3 or 16:9	non-square	progressive	25
576	720	4:3 or 16:9	non-square	interlaced	25 (50 fields/s)
576	720	4:3 or 16:9	non-square	progressive	25; 50

==== Broadcast-safe 525 video ====
Broadcast-safe standards for 525 lines of standard-definition (System M, NTSC, NTSC-J, PAL-M) video are:

- Common name = 525/60i (480i)
- Commonly used digital SD SDI baseband signal = SMPTE 259M-C, 270 Mbit/s bitrate
- Commonly used frame rate = 30 frame/s black-and-white, 29.97 interlaced frame/s color
- Black level = 7.5 IRE for NTSC, 0 IRE for NTSC-J in Japan and PAL-M in Brazil.
- Blanking level = 0 IRE
- White levels = 100 IRE, 714 mV
- Maximum signal level = 120 IRE
- Minimum signal level = −20 IRE

===== Variants =====
Resolution		Aspect ratio	Pixel aspect ratio	Form of scanning	Framerate (Hz)
Vertical	Horizontal	Aspect ratio	Pixel aspect ratio	Form of scanning	Framerate (Hz)
480	640	4:3	square	interlaced	29.97 (59.94 fields/s); 30 (60 fields/s)
480	640	4:3	square	progressive	23.976; 24; 29.97; 30; 59.94; 60
480	720	4:3 or 16:9	non-square	interlaced	29.97 (59.94 fields/s); 30 (60 fields/s)
480	720	4:3 or 16:9	non-square	progressive	23.976; 24; 29.97; 30; 59.94; 60

=== Broadcast-safe high-definition video ===
Digital broadcasting is very different from analog. The NTSC and PAL standards describe both transmission of the signal and how the electrical signal is converted into an image. In digital, there is a separation between the subject of how data is to be transmitted from tower to TV and the subject of what content that data might contain. While data transmission is likely to be a fixed and consistent affair, the content could vary from high-definition video to SD multicasting the next, and even to non-video datacasting. For ATSC 1.0, 8VSB transmits the data, while MPEG-2 encodes pictures and sound.

Resolution		Aspect ratio	Pixel aspect ratio	Form of scanning	Frame rate (Hz)
Vertical	Horizontal	Aspect ratio	Pixel aspect ratio	Form of scanning	Frame rate (Hz)
720	1280	16:9	square	progressive	23.976; 24; 25; 29.97; 30; 50; 59.94; 60
1080	1920	16:9	square	interlaced	25 (50 fields/s); 29.97 (59.94 fields/s); 30 (60 fields/s)
1080	1920	16:9	square	progressive	23.976; 24; 25; 29.97; 30; 50; 59.94; 60

== Broadcast-safe audio ==
Broadcast engineers in North America usually line up their audio gear to nominal reference level of 0 dB on a VU meter aligned to +4 dBu or −204 dBFS, in Europe equating to roughly +44 dBm or −184 dBFS. Peak signal levels must not exceed the nominal level by more than +10 dB.

Broadcast audio as a rule must be as free as possible of Gaussian noise, that is to say, it must be as far from the noise floor, as is reasonably possible considering the storage or transmission medium.

Broadcast audio must have a good signal-to-noise ratio, where speech or music is a bare minimum of 164 dB above the noise of the recording or transmission system. For audio that has a much poorer signal-to-noise ratio (like cockpit voice recorders), sonic enhancement is recommended.

== Non-standard video ==
Although almost any video gear can create problems when broadcast, equipment aimed at consumers sometimes produces video signals which are not broadcast safe. Usually this is to reduce the cost of the gear, since a non-standard video signal in the home might not create the problems that one might find in a broadcast facility. Potential flaws exist with:

- VHS and 8 mm: Consumer devices generally lack time base correction that may cause problems with genlock and sync with some analogue and digital broadcast equipment. Consumer analogue video systems have greater system noise and lower chrominance and luminance than is normal for standard definition TV. As a general broadcast engineering rule all analogue videotape origin material should be genlocked before transmission, but this is not mandatory or necessary for all conditions. All analogue videotape by default is broadcast safe under normal playing conditions.
- Older video game systems: Video game consoles before the sixth generation and 8-bit home computers generated a video signal lacking the half scan line needed to make interlacing happen. This subtle simplification caused NTSC sets to scan 240p/60 instead of 480i60, with similar results for PAL. While this actually improved picture quality for the kind of low-definition images that videogames of this era generated, such a signal modification could cause problems in a broadcast environment as the signal behaviour is outside the original television system specifications. Genlocking—but not timebase correction—are the recommended broadcast engineering solutions.
- Computer video signals: Computer video can be set up to run at many different frame or field rates, ranging 50 frame/s to more than 240 frame/s. Computer video is generally progressive by default, but many interlaced modes exist. A scan converter is typically needed to convert these signals to one of the many acceptable broadcast standards, such as 59.94 Hz or 50 Hz. This type of conversion typically degrades the quality of the broadcast image, usually resulting with either "motion artifacts" or a lower resolution. It is recommended that the display rate be set to equal the target television rate if possible.

== In digital television only environments ==
In nations that have fully converted to digital television, broadcast safe analogue television takes on a slightly different meaning. All broadcasting systems will have been mostly converted to digital only outputs, leaving fewer entry points for analogue television signals.

What this means is that all devices that feed to the television transmitter must take in and feed standard analogue television signals into the transmission chain. Mostly it is up to the switcher to notify if there is non-broadcast safe video to the programmer. However, due to the limitations of many switchers for DTV and HDTV it ultimately is up to the automation systems to alert the programmer of non-broadcast safe video inputs.

As a matter of broadcast engineering practice, 4:3 analogue television signals will always pose the most problems with broadcast safe compliance. The use of portable and cheap timebase-genlock systems for analogue television inputs in the digital television studio will be clearly mandatory for the next 50 years.

== See also ==
- 576i
- 480i
- VU meter
- Peak programme meter
- SMPTE color bars
- ProcAmp
- Safe area
