= NTSC-J =

Japanese variation of the NTSC analog television standard

Analog television encoding systems by nation (at time of digital switchover, where applicable): NTSC SECAM PAL No info

NTSC-J or "System J" is the informal designation for the analogue television standard used in Japan. The system is based on the US NTSC (NTSC-M) standard with minor differences. While NTSC-M is an official CCIR and FCC standard, NTSC-J or "System J" are a colloquial indicators.

The system was introduced by NHK and NTV, with regular color broadcasts starting on 10 September 1960.

NTSC-J was replaced by digital broadcasts in 44 of the country's 47 prefectures on 24 July 2011. Analogue broadcasting ended on 31 March 2012 in the three prefectures devastated by the 2011 Tōhoku earthquake and tsunami (Iwate, Miyagi, Fukushima) and the subsequent Fukushima Daiichi nuclear disaster.

The term NTSC-J is also informally used to distinguish regions in console video games, which use televisions (see Marketing definition below).

== Technical definition ==
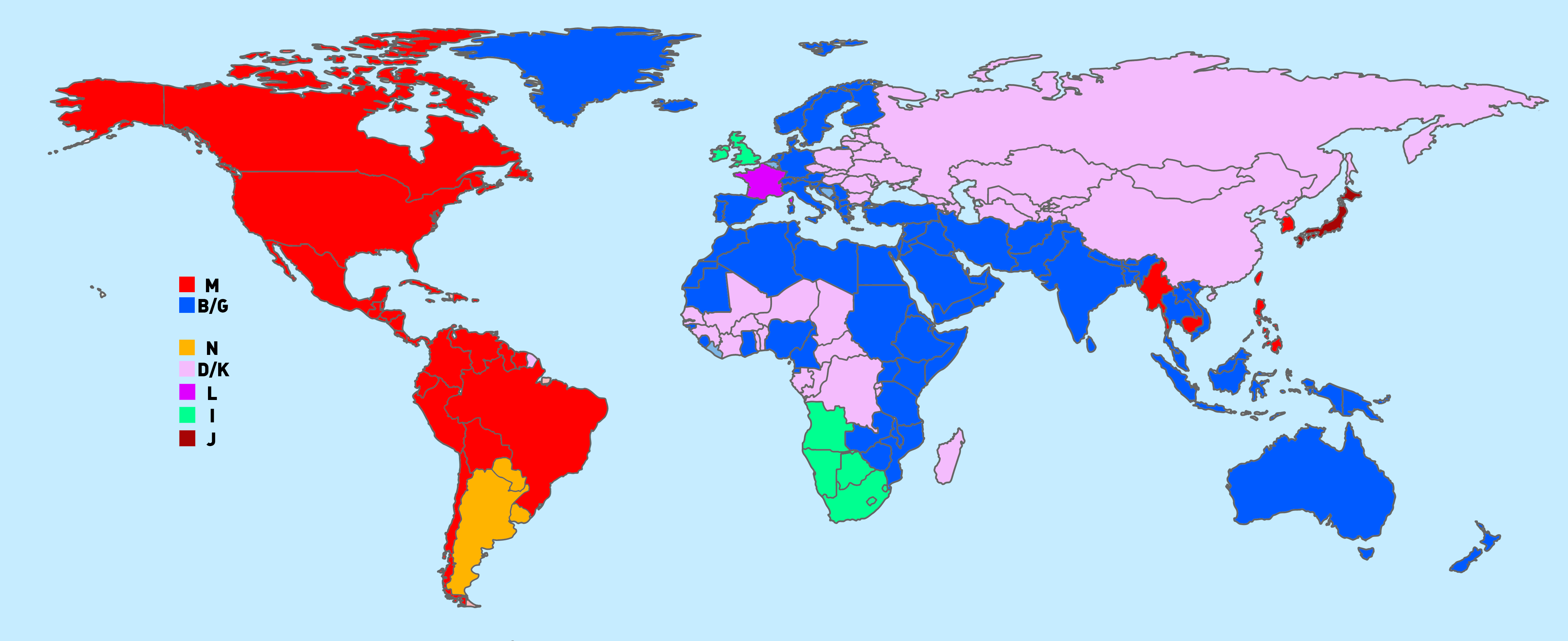
A list of analog television systems worldwide; "System J" of NTSC is designated in dark red

Japan implemented the NTSC standard with slight differences. The black and blanking levels of the NTSC-J signal are identical to each other (both at 0 IRE, similar to the PAL video standard), while in American NTSC the black level is slightly higher (7.5 IRE) than blanking level – because of the way this appears in the waveform, the higher black level is also called pedestal. This small difference doesn't cause any incompatibility problems, but needs to be compensated by a slight change of the TV brightness setting in order to achieve proper images.

YIQ color encoding in NTSC-J uses slightly different equations and ranges from regular NTSC. $I$ has a range of 0 to ±334 (±309 on NTSC-M), and $Q$ has a range of 0 to ±293 (±271 on NTSC-M).

YCbCr equations for NTSC-J are $C = (Cb-512)*(0.545)*(\sin\omega t) + (Cr-512)*(0.769)*(\cos\omega t)$, while on NTSC-M we have $C = (Cb-512)*(0.504)*(\sin\omega t) + (Cr-512)*(0.711)*(\cos\omega t)$.

NTSC-J also uses a white reference (color temperature) of 9300K instead of the usual NTSC-U standard of 6500K.

The over-the-air RF frequencies used in Japan do not match those of the US NTSC standard. On VHF the frequency spacing for each channel is 6 MHz as in North America, South America, Caribbean, South Korea, Taiwan, Burma (Myanmar), and the Philippines, except between channels 7 and 8 (which overlap). Channels 1 through 3 are reallocated for the expansion of the Japanese FM band. On UHF frequency spacing for each channel in Japan is the same, but the channel numbers are 1 lower than on the other areas mentioned – for example, channel 13 in Japan is on the same frequency as channel 14. For more information see Television channel frequencies. Channels 13-62 are used for analog and digital TV broadcasting.

The encoding of the stereo subcarrier also differs between NTSC-M/MTS and Japanese EIAJ MTS broadcasts.

== Marketing definition ==
The term NTSC-J was informally used to distinguish regions in console video games, which use televisions. NTSC-J is used as the name of the video gaming region of Japan (hence the "J"), South East Asia (some countries only), Taiwan, Hong Kong, Macau, Philippines, and South Korea (now NTSC-K) (formerly part of SE Asia with Hong Kong, Taiwan, Japan, etc.).

Most games designated as part of this region will not run on hardware designated as part of the NTSC-U, PAL (or PAL-E, "E" stands for Europe) or NTSC-C (for China) mostly due to the regional differences of the PAL (SECAM was also used in the early 1990s) and NTSC standards. Many older video game systems do not allow games from different regions to be played (accomplished by various forms of regional lockout); however more modern consoles either leave protection to the discretion of publishers, such as Microsoft's Xbox 360, or discontinue its use entirely, like Sony's PlayStation 3 (with a few exceptions).

China received its own designation due to fears of an influx of illegal copies flooding out of China, which is notorious for its rampant copyright infringements. There is also concern of copyright protection through regional lockout built into the video game systems and games themselves, as the same product can be edited by different publishers from one continent to another.

== See also ==
- Television in Japan

Broadcast television systems

- ATSC
- BTSC
- EIAJ MTS
- NTSC
- Clear-Vision
- PAL
- SECAM

Related topics

- RCA
- Oldest television station
- NTSC-C
- NTSC-U
