= Slate (broadcasting) =

Title card listing metadata

Example of a slate

In broadcasting, a slate is a title card listing important metadata of a television program, included before the first frame of the program. The broadcasting equivalent of a film leader, the slate is usually accompanied with color bars and tone, a countdown, and a 2-pop. In videotape workflows, slates help ensure that the tape received is the right one to broadcast (or to project, in the case of digital cinema) or to ingest into a digital playout system. It also provides helpful context for consideration in the re-editing of the material into a larger package. A convention from the videotape era of television broadcasting, the need for slates in a tapeless workflow has largely been usurped by the Material Exchange Format. However, the slate is still a regular and often-required fixture of television stations and other media companies as of 2023.

== Common information ==
Common information to include in a slate includes, but is not limited to:

- Title of the program
- Name of the production company and contact info
- Total run time (TRT)
- Production code number
- Date of edited master
- Type of master (e.g. broadcast master, duplication master, projection master)
- Timecode of start of first frame (typically 01:00:00.00, with the slate and associated leader material occurring before this)
- Frame rate
- Audio channel configuration
- Presence of textless elements (typically labelled as textless at/@ tail)

== See also ==
- Clapperboard
