= Picture line-up generation equipment =

Equipment to generate test patterns used by televisions

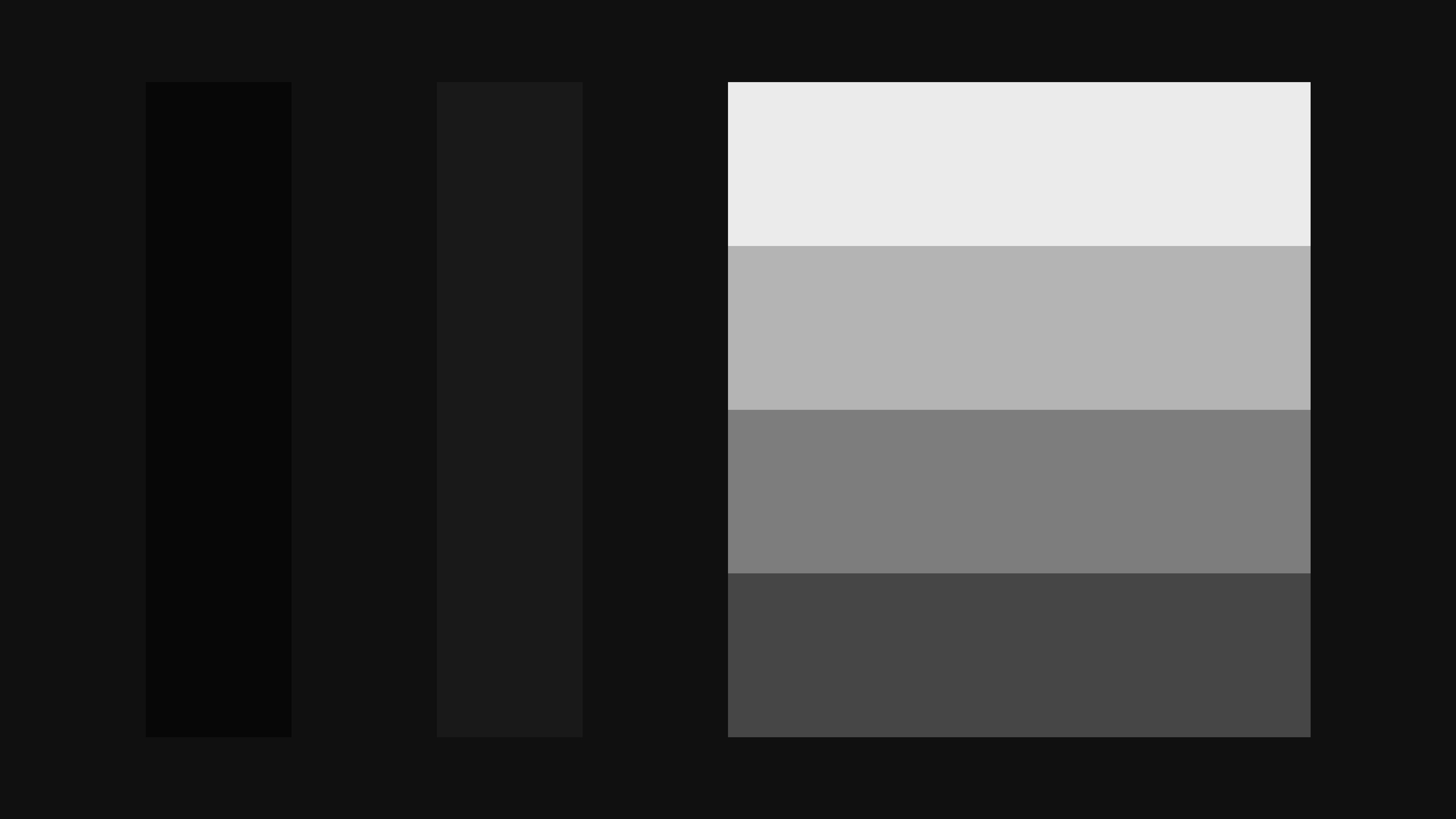
A Pluge signal as viewed on a monitor

SMPTE colour bars showing a pluge signal in the bottom half second square from the right

For televisions the picture line-up generation equipment (PLUGE or pluge) is a greyscale test pattern developed by the BBC used in order to adjust the black level and contrast of the picture monitor to make sure that all the cameras and monitors were calibrated throughout the building.

Various PLUGE patterns can be generated, the most common consisting of three vertical bars of super-black, normal black, and near-black and two rectangles of mid-gray and white (sometimes these are measured in IRE). These three PLUGE pulses are included in the SMPTE color bars (at the bottom and near the right) used for NTSC, PAL, and SÉCAM.

The image right (below) shows the traditional SMPTE 75% color bars in the resolution of SD. The PLUGE in this image are the three dark rectangles between the two black patches (each 0 IRE) in the third row.

The sequence of the dark patches is (in IRE): 0, 3.5, 7.5, 11.5, 0

These three patches near black were designed to ensure that the camera and monitors would not be calibrated too dark.

== Literature ==
- Brown, Blain (2021), Cinematography: Theory and Practice, doi:10.4324/9780429353239, ISBN 978-0-429-35323-9}
