= Sound multiplex in broadcasting =

Method to deliver alternative audio feeds in television and radio

In broadcasting, sound multiplex is a method to deliver alternative audio feeds on television and radio channels.

== Usage ==
This way, a television or radio channel can carry surround sound (like stereo or 5.1 surround sound), or alternative audio programming where an audio track in different language, alternative sports commentary, or audio description for people with visual impairment can be heard.

== Standards ==
Analogue television

- EIAJ MTS, a standard developed by Electronic Industries Association of Japan (EIAJ) in Japan
- Multichannel television sound (MTS), a standard developed in the United States, and adopted in Argentina, Brazil, Canada, Chile, Mexico, Philippines, Taiwan and United States
  - Second audio program (SAP), part of MTS
- Near Instantaneous Companded Audio Multiplex (NICAM), a standard developed in the United Kingdom, and adopted in major European and Asia-Pacific countries
- Zweikanalton (a.k.a. A2 Stereo), a standard developed in Germany, and mainly adopted in Australia, Austria, Germany, Serbia, Croatia, Netherlands, South Korea and Switzerland

Analogue radio

- Subsidiary communications authority (SCA), a standard developed in the United States, and also adopted in Canada
  - FMeXtra, a digital application of SCA
- HD Radio, a proprietary digital standard also established and used in the U.S. and Canada
