= Colorplexer =

Encoding device

Color television as introduced in North America in 1954 is best described as being 'colored' television. The system used the existing black and white signal but with the addition of a component intended only for television receivers designed to show color. By careful application this 'colored' signal was ignored by ordinary TV sets and had negligible effect on the appearance of the black and white image. This meant that color programs were viewable on the many existing black and white receivers which fulfilled a requirement for 'compatibility' desired by the television industry. Once the so-called 'composite' video signal containing the color component had been generated it could be handled just as if it were a black and white signal, eliminating the need to replace much of the existing TV infrastructure. Colorplexer was the RCA name for the equipment that created this 'composite' color signal from three separate images each created in the primary colors, Red, Green and Blue supplied by a color video camera. This process was by the standards of the day quite complex and demanded accurate control of all the various parameters involved if an acceptable color image was to be achieved. The simplification afforded by this 'head end' approach became evident and contributed to the gradual acceptance of color programming over the following decades.

== National standard ==
The National Television System Committee, NTSC, standard was the analog television system that was used in most of the North America from 1941 until the mandatory cutover to ATSC in 2009. However, low-power TV stations were permitted to operate with NTSC, for now, but many have since converted to ATSC. This national standard was later adopted (or, in some cases, adapted) in other jurisdictions, such as Japan.

The Second NTSC Standard (525/30, 1941 and later) anticipated that the extant monochrome TV system would eventually incorporate a provision for monochrome-compatible color television. The First NTSC Standard (441/30, pre-1941) had no such expectation, as even the extant motion picture 3-color system, "Three-Strip" Technicolor, was then only five years old. The Second NTSC Standard, as revised for color, sometimes called EIA RS-170a, was operational in North America and elsewhere from 1953 until this standard was replaced by ATSC in the early 21st century.

Central to this revised standard was a mandate for an information stream, at the transmitter, and broadcast to TV sets (receivers), which was independent of whether the signal was monochrome (already in existence since 1941) or color (adopted in 1953).

This significant mandate was satisfied by an encoding device which came to be known as a Colorplexer.

== Signal management ==
Colorplexer (a portmanteau of "color" and "multiplexer") was the RCA trade name for its complex electronic device which encoded discrete red, green and blue 3-color images, as from a color camera, into a composite monochrome-compatible color information stream.

In RCA's recommendation for monochrome-compatible color TV, generally called "NTSC color", each color TV source (as, from a CCU) incorporated its own colorplexer, thereby providing the remaining equipment, all of which were presumed to have originated as a monochrome equipment system, with a signal which could be managed (generated, switched, transmitted, received, etcetera) as if the signal was not color at all, but was an ordinary composite monochrome signal.

This was a strategic decision on RCA's part, and this "one Colorplexer per color source" concept became part of RCA's color TV equipment marketing recommendations. While it made each color source significantly more complicated, hence more expensive, it also obviated the need for major changes to a TV station's signal management system, and the cost of signal management (particularly for networks involving widely separated sources and destinations, such as RCA's wholly owned NBC-TV network) was seen as considerably higher in cost than the color signal sources themselves, as otherwise it would have to be changed from a (composite) Y-only management system into a (component) R-, G- and B-management system (thereby effectively tripling the cost of color signal distribution).

Using today's three-phase electrical system in an analogy, overlaying an R-, G- and B-color TV signal management system upon an existing monochrome TV signal management system would be analogous to requiring public utility power systems to convert from three-phase to nine-phase electricity, an insurmountable cost penalty.

The Second NTSC Standard did not specifically mandate RCA's "one Colorplexer per color source" recommendation, as long as the signal actually transmitted to the signal's end user was monochrome-compatible, and this could have been satisfied by an R, G and B signal management system, and a single Colorplexer at the transmitter, and this would have been adequate for small-market TV stations, particularly those with video sources which were co-located at the station's transmitter site. However, the obvious high cost of R-, G- and B-signal management within a large-market TV station, with separate studio and transmitter sites (sources and destinations separated by perhaps one to tens of miles), or particularly within a TV network, with geographically widely separated sources and destinations (sources and destinations separated by perhaps hundreds to thousands of miles), resulted in adoption of RCA's "one Colorplexer per color source" recommendation almost universally, and particularly after Ampex's introduction of color videotape in 1958 (which was never a component system at all, but was always inherently a composite system), and Ampex's (and, later, RCA's) color videotape systems became essential subsystems of multi-time-zone (national, or, indeed, international) network color TV distribution and transmission.

Initially, the instability of the early Colorplexers caused many operational problems as no two Colorplexers were adjusted alike, and these had to be constantly "tweaked", as did the video sources themselves. Eventually, Colorplexer stability improved, as did the stability of the video sources, and NTSC color would go on to provide consistently good color, and it did so until 2009, nearly 56 years, a remarkable technological achievement, as, compared with "Three-Strip" Technicolor, perhaps the "exemplar" for color motion pictures, which lasted only 19 years (from 1936 to 1955).

== Encoder ==
The R, G, and B primary color signals are weighted and then summed together into the Luma signal, Yʹ (Y prime), which is roughly equivalent to a monochrome signal.

With the addition of inputs from the synchronizing generator, which supplies the blanking and composite synch signals, and inputs from the color burst generator, which supplies the 3.579545 MHz color burst and the "burst gate" signals, the colorplexer, using an "encoder", synthesizes a compatible signal which includes luminance (described earlier) and chrominance (an amplitude-modulated suppressed-carrier signal with "I" and "Q" in quadrature, and which represents the differences between the color signals and the monochrome signal), the combination of which produces a monochrome-compatible color information stream.

The "burst gate" admits eight cycles of the 3.579545 MHz "color burst" and applies this to the "back porch" of each horizontal synch pulse (the vertical synch is unaffected). These eight cycles are just enough to supply a color TV receiver with a reference with which it can correct its own 3.579545 MHz local oscillator as to frequency and phase, phase being the most significant aspect of the process of recovering the "I" and "Q" signals.

The "matrix" adopted by RCA was Y = 0.30R + 0.59G + 0.11B; the three weighting factors were selected such that their sum was 1.0.

As with "prior art" two-color systems, such as pre-1932 Technicolor, the G signal predominates the R signal; and, as with "prior art" three-color systems, such as 1932 and later "Three-Strip" Technicolor, the G and R signals predominate the B signal.

RCA's color system was developed while "Three-Strip" Technicolor was the "gold standard", and Eastman Kodak's Eastmancolor would not completely displace "Three-Strip" Technicolor for another half-decade. Indeed, RCA's P22 CRT phosphor was intended to mimic Technicolor's dramatic color palette.

In most practical color systems, including RCA's, the G signal is taken to be the reference as it has the highest resolution. Indeed, in 1932 to 1944 "Three-Strip" Technicolor, the image was enhanced by printing a monochrome image which was taken from a 0.5G negative (called the "key" image, and hence that color system was really an RGBK system, not unlike graphic arts' YCMK system) on the film's "blank receiver" before the color dyes were applied, as an edge enhancement measure.

Edge enhancement is now a part of many electronically based color systems, but in "Three-Strip" Technicolor's day, it was accomplished photographically from the G image, the sharpest of the three.

== Monochrome compatibility ==
Conventional monochrome TV sets will accept this signal as if there were no chrominance or burst signals at all. A monochrome image, Y, with minimal or no defects (such as moiré, etcetera) will be displayed.

The "I", "Q" and "color burst" signals will be ignored, leaving only the monochrome image.

== Color Compatibility ==
Color TV sets will accept this signal and will, first, separate the monochrome image, Y, and will, second, decode the "I" and "Q" signals, using the extracted "color burst" 3.579545 MHz signal as a phase reference to decode these signals.

Applying the monochrome image and the decoded "I" and "Q" signals to the mathematical inverse of the "matrix" reverse synthesizes the R, G and B primary color signals, which were applied to a "shadow mask" or equivalent TV tube, and which displays a 3-color color image.
