= BTSC =

BTSC may refer to:

- BTSC (from Broadcast Television Systems Committee), an alternative name of Multichannel Television Sound, a television audio standard of the United States
- Bangkok Mass Transit System Company, a Thai transport company
