= NTSC-C =

Gaming system regional lockout

Analog television encoding systems by nation (at time of digital switchover, where applicable): NTSC SECAM PAL No info

NTSC-C is a regional lockout created in 2003 by Sony Computer Entertainment for the official launch of its PlayStation 2 gaming system into the mainland Chinese market.

== Mainland Chinese market ==
The system's original model, then called PlayStation 2, was launched throughout 2000, 2001 and 2002 in Japan, North America, Europe, Oceania, Hong Kong, Taiwan, and South Korea, but it was not introduced in mainland China because of rampant piracy.

However the situation changed in November 2003 as Sony China announced the PlayStation 2 (SCPH-50009 "Satin Silver" type) was planned to be launched in mainland China for Christmas, official release date December 20, 2003. Sony China Chairman Hiroshi Soda explained the situation:

Sony was previously reluctant to introduce PlayStation 2 into the Chinese market due to the piracy problem. But we changed our minds as we think that the piracy situation cannot be controlled 100 percent, not only in China but also in many other countries and regions in the world. We have to be courageous, to face the reality.

Sales would be first limited to five large industrialized cities Beijing, Shanghai, Guangzhou, Shenzhen, and Chengdu, then distribution would start in the whole country. However, on the eve of Christmas, arguing an "unfavorable environment," Sony China delayed the release. Kenichi Fukunaga, a Sony Japan spokesman in Tokyo, reportedly declared "the company simply had not prepared in time for the China launch." The system finally launched on New Year's Day of 2004 with sales limited to Shanghai and Guangzhou.

The "NTSC-C" regional lockout for mainland China was specially created as the system is also a home NTSC DVD player with its specific Zone 6 regional code which is not compatible with the bordering countries (Japan is Zone 2; South Korea, Hong Kong, and Taiwan are all Zone 3, etc.)

In total, 16 NTSC-C games were released throughout 2004-2005.

== Marketing definition ==
"C" stands for China. However Hong Kong, Macau, and Taiwan are part of the NTSC-J region which was initially created for Japan.

NTSC-C is used as the name of the video gaming region of continental China, despite the country's historical use of PAL as the official TV standard instead of NTSC.

Games designated as part of this region will not run on hardware designated as part of the NTSC-J (that include Traditional Chinese 中文版 version for Hong Kong, Taiwan, Singapore, and Malaysia, instead of Simplified Chinese for China), NTSC-U and PAL mostly due to the regional differences of the PAL (SECAM was also used in the early 1990s) and NTSC TV standards, but there is also a concern of copyright protection through regional lockout built into the video game systems and games themselves, as the same product can be released by different publishers on different continents.

== See also ==
- ATSC
- BTSC
- NTSC
- NTSC-J
- NTSC-U
- PAL
- PAL-E
- SECAM
