= RCA TK-40/41 =

First practical color television camera (1953–67)

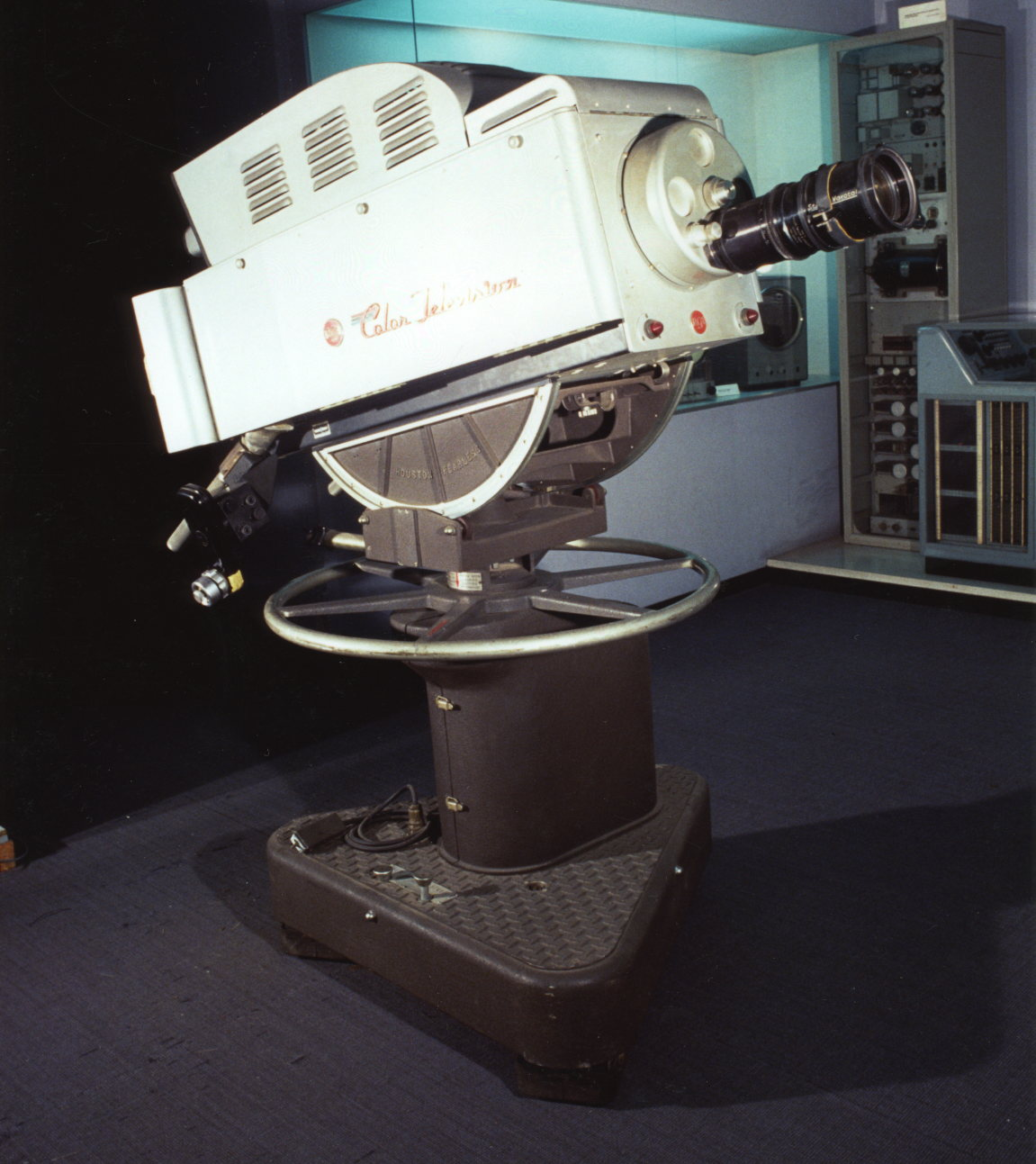
RCA TK-41

The RCA TK-40 is considered to be the first practical color television camera, initially used for special broadcasts in late 1953, and with the follow-on TK-40A actually becoming the first to be produced in quantity in March 1954. The TK-40 was produced by RCA Broadcast to showcase the new compatible color system for NTSC—eventually named NTSC-M or simply M—which the company is credited with inventing (though several other companies including Philco were involved in development). Color had been attempted many times before, often in a semi-mechanical fashion, but this was the first series of practical, fully electronic cameras to go into widespread production.

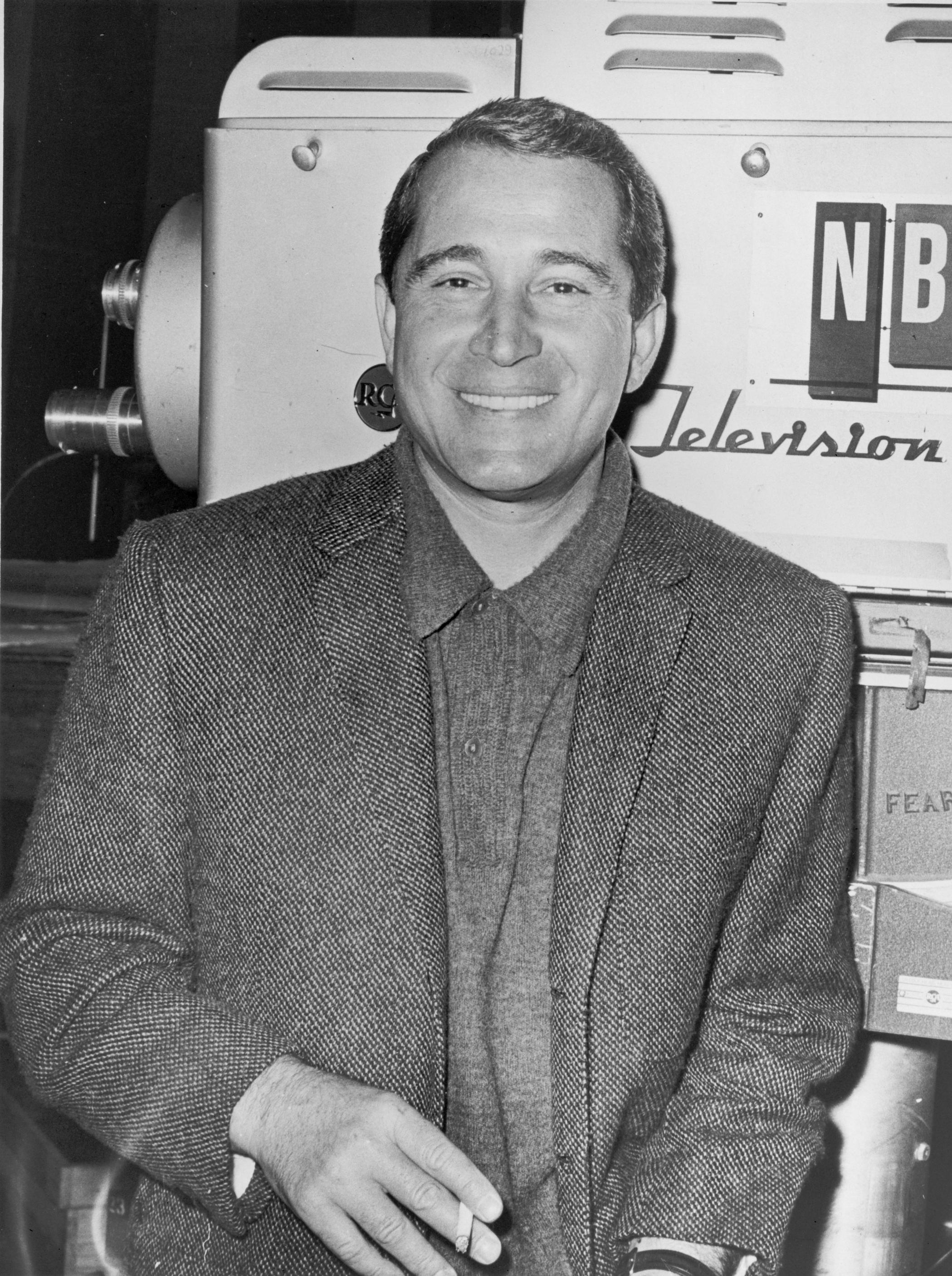
NBC's 1950s star Perry Como poses with TK-41 camera

The camera was quickly followed with the TK-41, a line that shared a very similar shape, but featured streamlined and enhanced electronic subsystems. Earlier TK-40s are distinguished by the lack of venting slots on the sides (the cameras were prone to overheating, necessitating the addition of these openings). The last variation of the TK-41 was the TK-41C, released circa 1960. The cameras are considered to have been of very good quality, better than the very different TK-42 which succeeded the TK-40/41, and probably better than anything produced by RCA for several years after the production line shut down (NBC didn't fully replace their TK-41s in Rockefeller Center or their Burbank, California broadcast facility until the release of the TK-44A around 1968). Prior development in the late 1940s and early 1950s had included the TK-X (for "experimental").

An image (beam) splitter was used in the TK-40/41 to direct the incoming light into three image orthicon tubes for recording moving pictures in the red, green, and blue component colors. The early cameras required a very large amount of lighting, which caused television studios to become very warm due to the use of multi-kilowatt lamps (a problem that still exists somewhat today, but is less pronounced). The RCA TK-40 and TK-41 color cameras required more than an hour to set up and were comparatively unstable, making frequent adjustment necessary to maintain correct color balance between the red, green, and blue primary colors. These cameras also required complicated control consoles and rack-mounted power supplies for the camera's many vacuum tubes and ventilator fans cooling their large image orthicon tubes.

The cameras, which weighed hundreds of pounds on their own, were only one component of the TK-40/41 system. There were also backend devices placed in the control rooms (camera control units and colorplexers) to generate both full NTSC outputs routed to the program switchers as well as signals for the cameras for both video and intercom communication among crew members (the cameras integrated an audio system so that camera operators could talk to others via headsets). This combined chain was required in order to produce images. The TK-41's camera head weighed 300 pounds (136 kg) and had to be carried by at least two people when setting up for remote broadcasts.

The TK-40 was used for a color telecast of the opera Carmen on October 31, 1953, apparently on a closed-circuit system (monochrome images were apparently broadcast with the color burst removed). The first commercial telecast was of the Colgate Comedy Hour with Donald O'Connor on November 22, but the color burst may have again been removed. The Federal Communications Commission finally approved the color system for use on December 17 of that year, allowing telecasts to begin 30 days later. Special permission was received to broadcast the Tournament of Roses Parade on January 1, 1954. Patti Page and her The Big Record show for CBS was the first television show broadcast in color for the entire 1957–1958 season. The live broadcast was staged in the now famous Ed Sullivan Theatre and production costs were greater than most movies were at the time not only because of all the stars featured on the hour-long extravaganza but the extreme high intensity lighting and electronics required for the new RCA TK-40 cameras.

TK-40A camera setups were brought to several TV stations around the country as part of demonstrations throughout the year, including: WKY, Oklahoma City, Oklahoma (April 8); WBAP, Fort Worth, Texas (May 15); WTMJ-TV, Milwaukee, Wisconsin (July 18); WBEN Buffalo, New York; WCCO Minneapolis, Minnesota, (August 5); and KTLA Los Angeles, California.

== Variations ==
- TK-40 (1953)
- TK-40A (March 1954)
- TK-41A (1954–?)
- TK-41B
- TK-41C (1960?–1967)
