= Black level =

Video black level is defined as the level of brightness at the darkest (black) part of a visual image or the level of brightness at which no light is emitted from a screen, resulting in a pure black screen.

Video displays generally need to be calibrated so that the displayed black is true to the black information in the video signal. If the black level is not correctly adjusted, visual information in a video signal could be displayed as black, or black information could be displayed as above black information (gray).

The voltage of the black level varies across different television standards. PAL sets the black level the same as the blanking level, while NTSC sets the black level approximately 54 mV above the blanking level.

== See also ==
- Picture line-up generation equipment (PLUGE)
