= Processing amplifier =

Amplifier with signal processing

Processing amplifier, commonly called ProcAmp, is used to alter, change or clean video or audio signal components or parameters in realtime.

== Form factor ==
Broadcast professionals prefer to use hardware rack mountable ProcAmps that helps them make video broadcast safe by correcting video inconsistencies. They may also be chip-based, as part of other larger multi-purpose devices in professional environments.

Software ProcAmps are also available as code embedded in media players like Windows Media Player, VLC, KMPlayer, or in codecs like ffdshow. Software ProcAmps can process media either on the CPU or GPU.

== Video ProcAmp ==
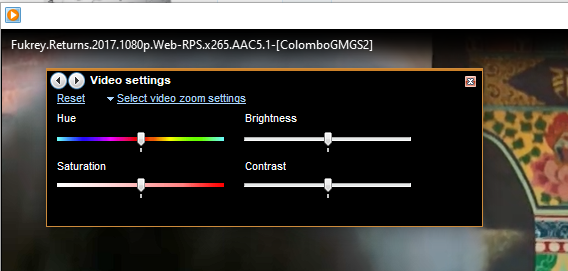
A Software Video ProcAmp.

Video ProcAmps can be used for processing standard-definition 525/30 (NTSC) 625/25 (PAL) or high-definition video signals. ProcAmps can process video signals ranging from analog composite to SDI video signals.

=== Common controls ===
- Brightness (Luminance)
- Contrast (Gain)
- Saturation (Amplitude)
- Hue (Phase)

=== Common features ===
- Regenerate sync and color burst
- Adjust sync amplitude
- Boost low light level video
- Reduce video wash out
- Chroma clipping

== See also ==
- Video processing
- Broadcast-safe
