= Clapperboard =

Device used to aid in the syncing of audio with a moving image

Digital facsimile of a clapperboard

A clapperboard, also known as a dumb slate, clapboard, film clapper, film slate, movie slate, or production slate, is a device used in filmmaking, television production and video production to assist in synchronizing of picture and sound, and to designate and mark the various scenes and takes as they are filmed and audio-recorded. It is operated by the clapper loader. It is said to have been invented by Australian filmmaker F. W. Thring. Due to its ubiquity on film sets, the clapperboard is frequently featured in behind-the-scenes footage and films about filmmaking, and has become an enduring symbol of the film industry as a whole.

== History ==
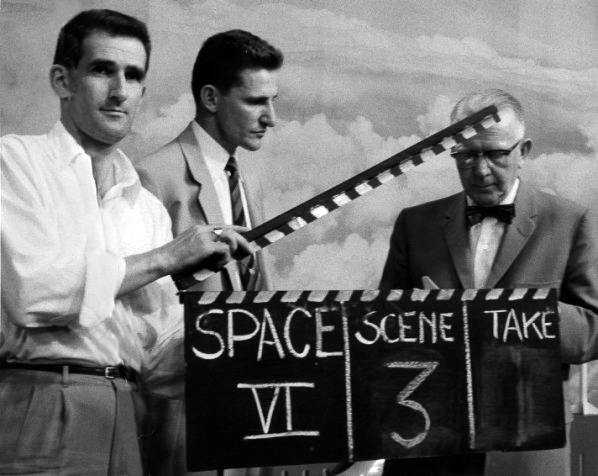
Clapperboard c. 1953

In the silent era the principal requirement of film stock identification during a day's shoot was the slate.

The clapper as two sticks hinged together is credited to F. W. Thring (father of actor Frank Thring), who later became head of Efftee Studios in Melbourne, Australia. The invention, however, is thought to be the responsibility of two of his sound engineers: Alan Mill and Harry Whiting. The clapperboard with both the sticks and slate together was a refinement of Leon M. Leon (1903–1998), a pioneer sound engineer.

== Description ==
A clapperboard is made up of a chalkboard, slate, or acrylic board, with a pair of clapper sticks positioned across the top. One stick is fixed to the upper edge of the slate, while the other is hinged at one end, allowing it to move. The slate typically displays the name of the production, along with details such as the scene and the "take" that is about to be filmed, as well as other relevant information; a camera assistant holds the clapperboard so the slate is in view of the cameras with the clapper sticks already open, speaks out information for the benefit of the audio recording, then snaps the sticks shut. Chalk or dry-erase markers may be used to write on the slate or whiteboard respectively.

The shutting of the clapper sticks is easily identified on the visual track, and the sharp "clap" noise is easily identified on the separate audio track. The two tracks can later be precisely synchronized by matching the sound and movement. Since each take is expressly identified on both the visual and audio tracks, segments of film are easily matched with corresponding segments of audio.

== Purpose ==
Finding a way to synchronize visual and audio tracks was essential to traditional filmmaking because film stock reacts to light, not sound. During a film shoot, the audio track was always recorded by the audio engineer with a separate system on separate media (so-called double-system recording). (For early sound films, playback of the audio track was synchronized during post-production with sound-on-disc techniques; engineers later figured out how to directly add an audio track to a release print with sound-on-film techniques.) Failure to use clapperboards can prevent the film editor from synchronizing the visual images on film footage with the accompanying audio recordings, as actually happened with the long-delayed film Amazing Grace.

Methods were later developed to directly record sound to film as part of a single system integrated with the film camera (so-called single-system recording), which was most commonly used with small formats like Super 8 film. However, single-system recording did not render clapperboards obsolete. First, single-system recording of sound-on-film is "decidedly inferior in audio quality" to traditional double-system recording. Second, footage from single-system recording is difficult to shoot and edit. Since the sound playback head cannot block the projector gate and must be placed after the gate, the soundtrack must be offset by several frames (usually 28, 26, or 18 ahead) to maintain sync with the frame in the gate. With such footage, cutting to the next shot when an actor's lips stop moving will risk cutting off their last syllable, unless the soundtrack is copied and edited on a separate system, and actors must be directed to pause to allow for such cuts. Because of these technical limitations, the film industry has continued to use double-system recording for professional-quality film projects.

The development of videotape made single-system recording less inconvenient, since video and audio signals corresponding to the exact same point in time could now be captured and stored together as magnetic signals on the same medium. Despite that, contemporary digital cinematography still relies upon double-system recording, which means that directors of professional-quality film and television productions still need to use clapperboards. The main reason is that the audio features needed for quality single-system recording are found only on midrange or "prosumer" digital cameras. Low-end cameras omit those features for cost reasons. High-end professional cameras omit those features because manufacturers assume that a professional film crew will follow the well-established tradition of hiring a sound engineer (along with other sound specialists to form a sound department) who will bring along and use dedicated audio recording equipment.

== Construction ==
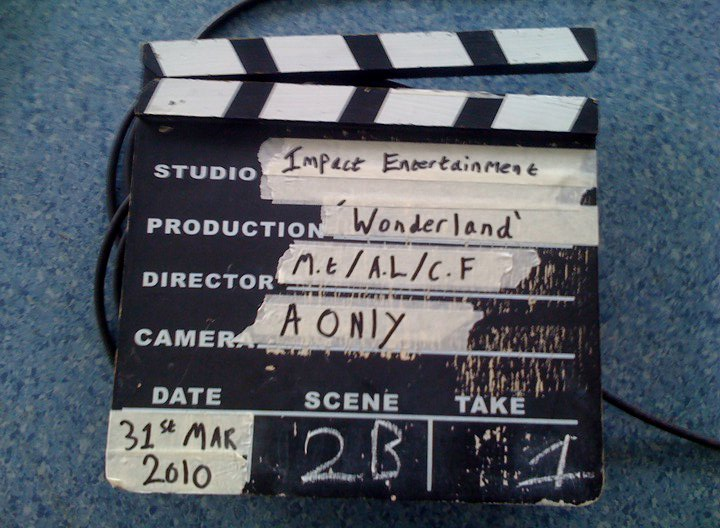
A traditional wooden slate clapperboard.

A traditional clapperboard (i.e., a dumb slate) consists of a wooden slate with a hinged clapper stick attached to its top. A modern clapperboard generally uses a pair of wooden sticks atop either a whiteboard or a translucent acrylic glass slate (the latter being easily legible via the light coming through it from the scene about to be shot). The clapper sticks traditionally have diagonally interleaved lines of black and white to ensure the camera can capture a clear visual image of the clap in most lighting conditions. In recent years sticks with calibrated color stripes have become available.

A digislate is a clapperboard with an inbuilt electronic box displaying SMPTE timecodes. The timecode displayed on the clapperboard will have been jam synced with the internal clock of the camera, so that in theory it should be easy for the film editor to pull the timecode metadata from the video file and sound clip and synchronize them together. When SMPTE timecodes actually work as intended, they relieve the film editor of the age-old chore of manually matching the exact frame in which the clapper sticks close to the "corresponding peak in the audio wave". This chore can be very "tedious" if "there is a large number of shots in a program". However, electronic timecodes can still drift during a long shooting day, so the clapper sticks on the clapperboard still need to be closed together in the traditional fashion, in order to ensure there is a way of manually synchronizing video and audio if matching the digital timecode fails.

== Operation ==
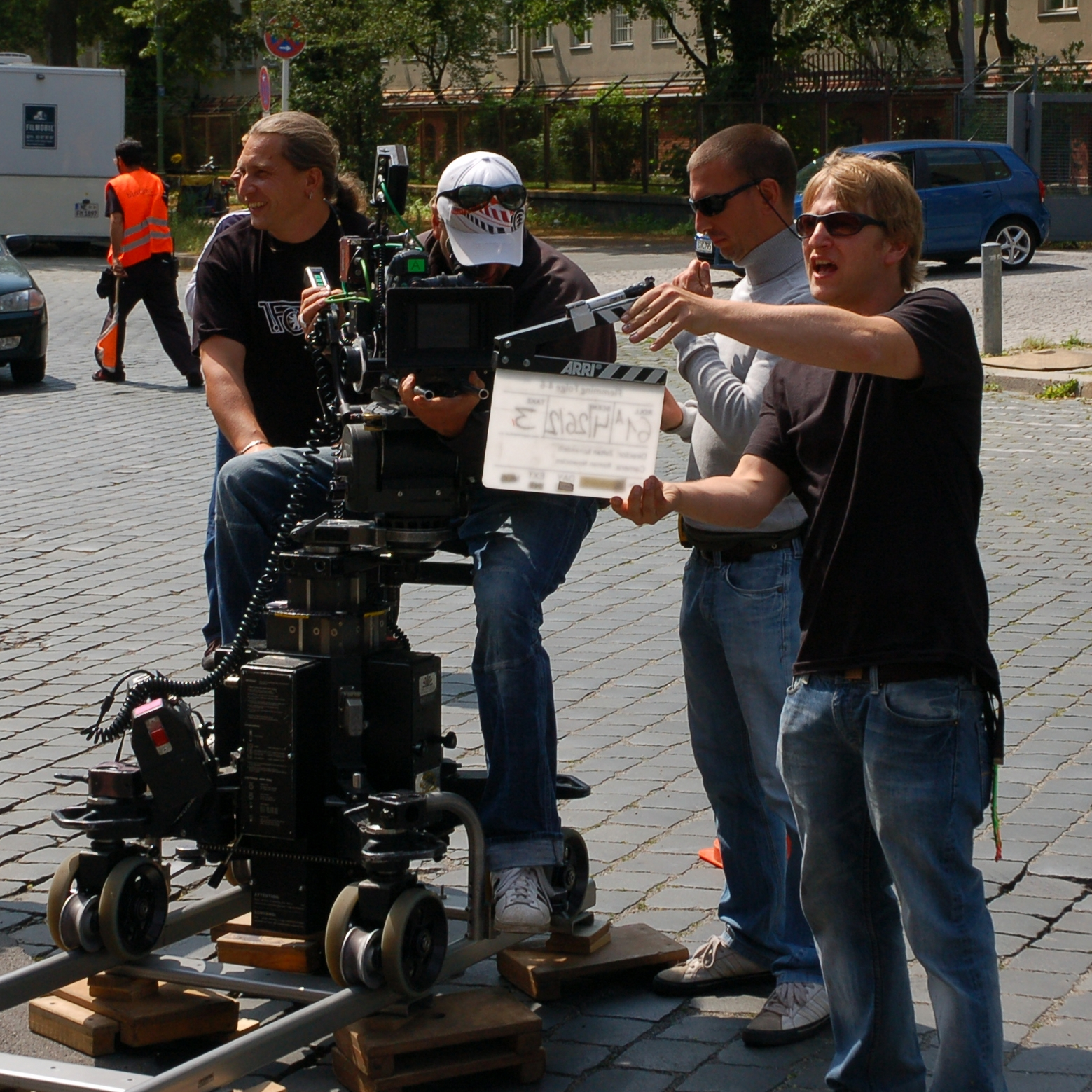
A clapperboard in use

The slate typically includes the date, the production title, the name of the director, the name of the director of photography (DoP) and the scene information — which follows two popular systems:

1. American: scene number, camera angle and take number; e.g. scene 24, C, take 3;
2. European: slate number, take number (with the letter of the camera shooting the slate if using multiple-camera setup); e.g. slate 256, take 3C. Often, the European system will also include the scene number; however, a separate continuity sheet that maps the slate number to the scene number, camera angle and take number may be used if the scene number is not included on the slate. This is generally not as great a concern with short films, however.

A verbal identification of the numbers, known either as "voice slate" or "announcement", occurs after sound has reached speed. At the same time or shortly thereafter, the camera will start running, and the clapperboard is then filmed briefly at the start of the take; its two sticks are snapped sharply together as soon as the camera has reached sync speed. Specific procedures vary depending on the nature of the production (documentary, television, feature, commercial etc.), and the dominant camera assisting regional conventions.

A clapperboard is generally used to identify all takes on a production, even takes that do not require synchronization, such as MOS takes, which have no sound. When a slate is used to mark an MOS take, the slate is held half open, with a hand blocking the sticks, or closed, with a hand over the sticks.

=== Operator ===
The clapper loader (or 2nd AC) is generally responsible for the maintenance and operation of the clapperboard, while the script supervisor is responsible for determining which system will be used and what numbers a given take should have. While these are usually fairly obvious once a system has been agreed upon, the script supervisor is usually considered the final arbiter in the event of an unclear situation.

=== Alternatives ===
Sometimes a "tail slate" or end slate is filmed at the end of a take, during which the clapperboard is held upside-down. This is done when the slate was not captured at the start of the take due to the camera being set up for the shot in such a way that the board cannot be captured, for example when a specific focus or frame is set up and cannot be altered until the take is complete. Tail slates are also commonly used when the director makes the decision that clapping a slate at the beginning of the scene would be distracting to the actor, such as when filming a highly emotional performance.

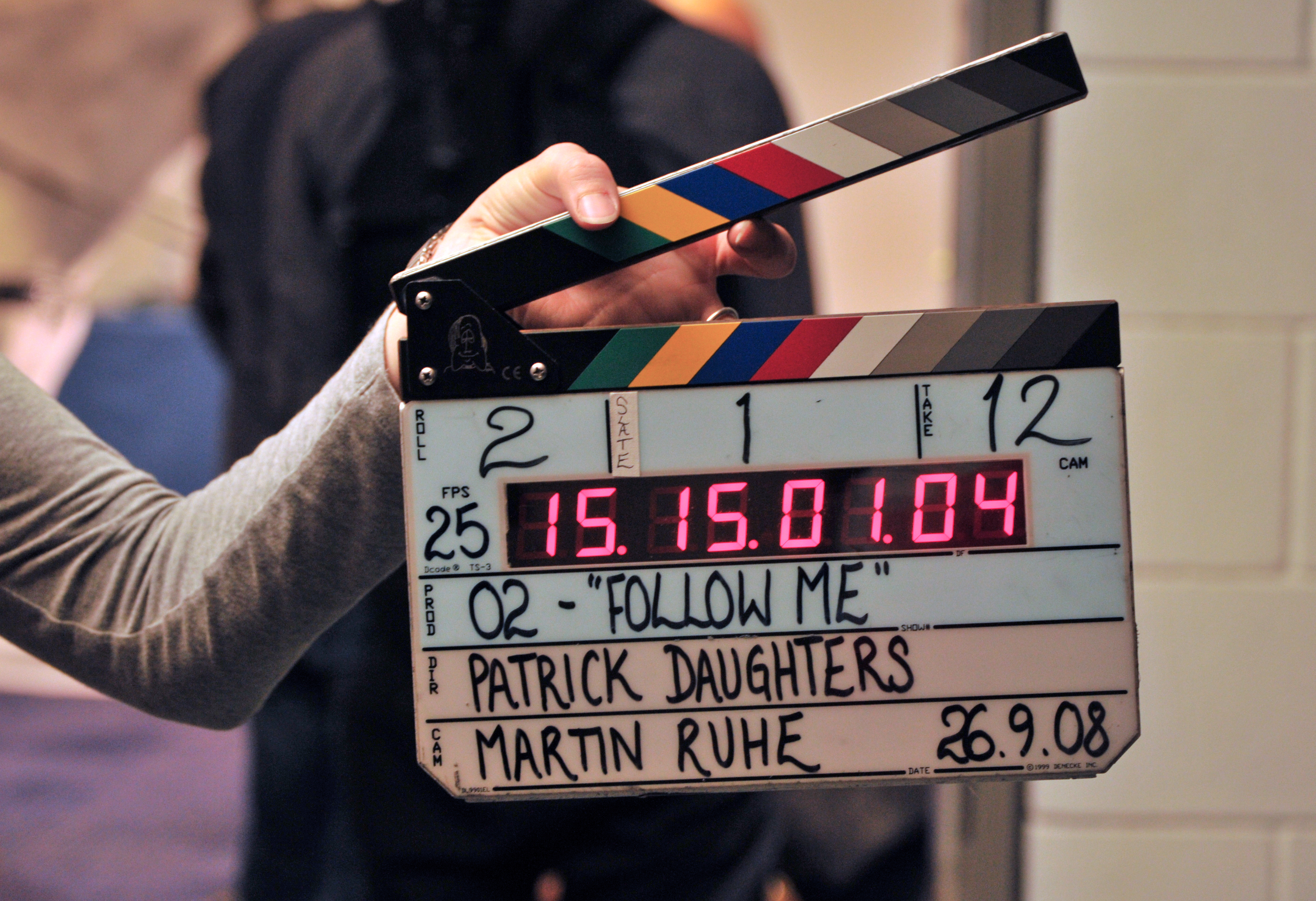
A Denecke clapperboard containing LED display with SMPTE Timecode and colored stripes on the sticks.

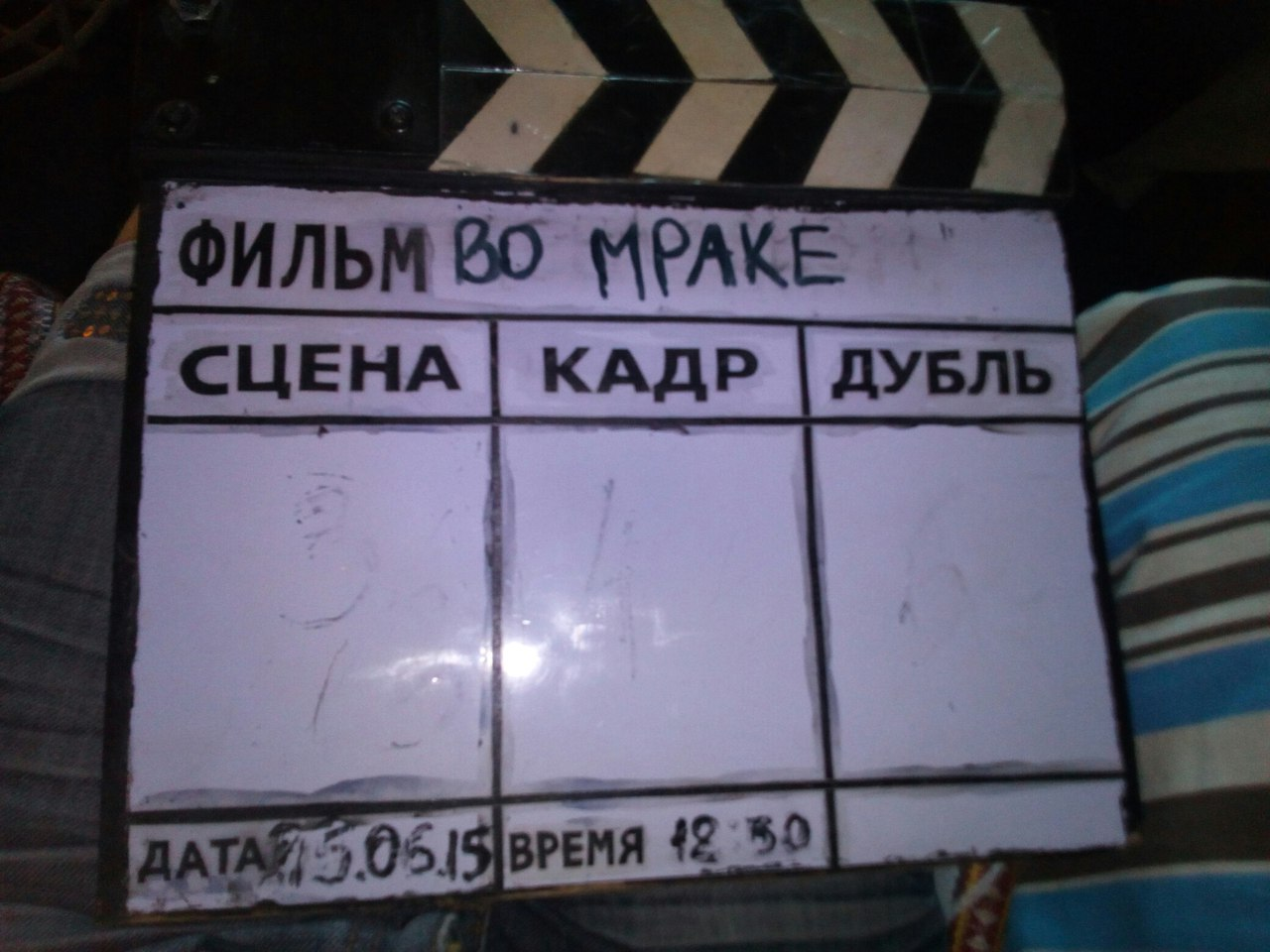
A clapperboard with a dry-erase display being used for a Russian-language film.

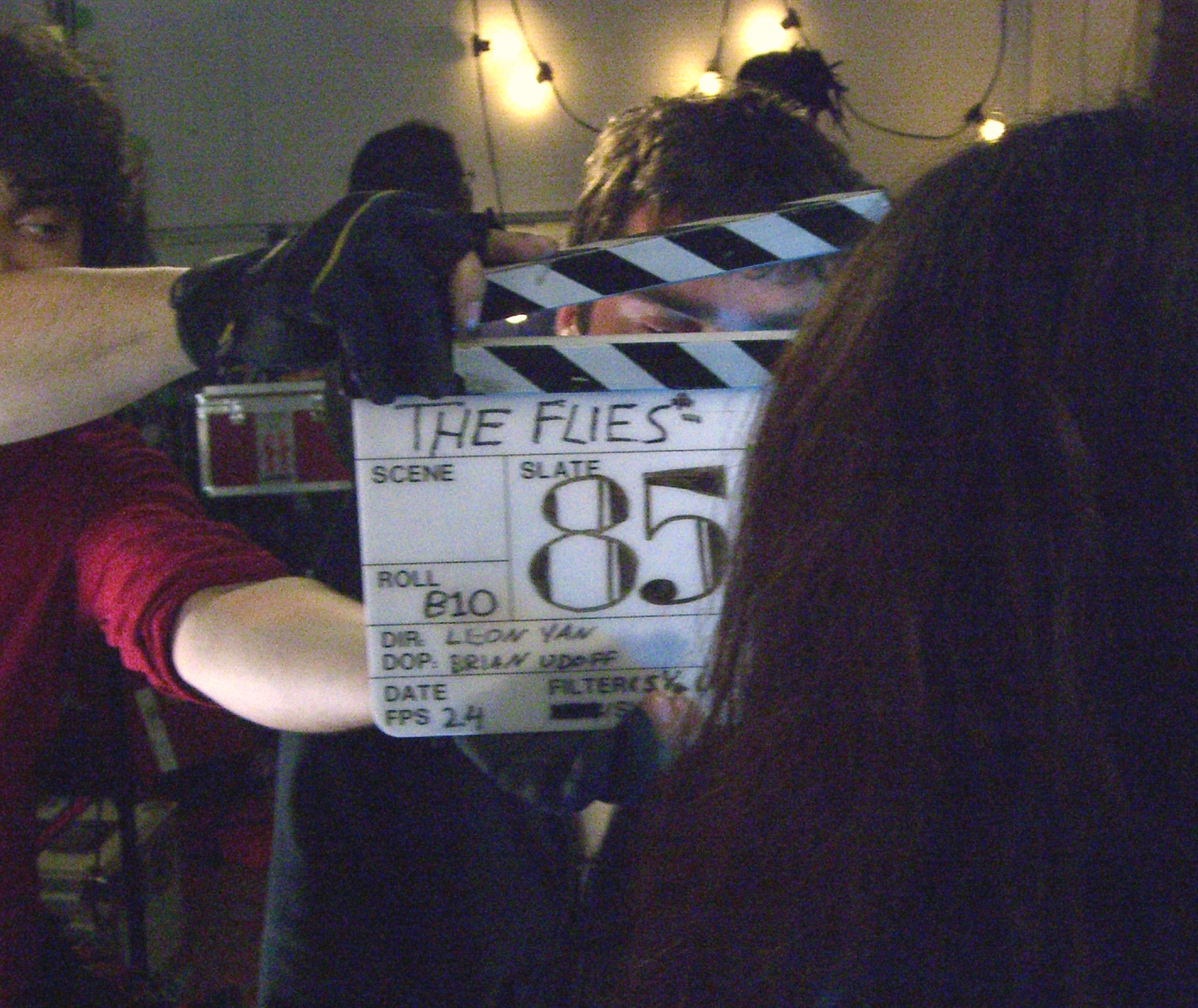
An acrylic glass clapperboard in use

== See also ==
- Slate (broadcasting), a title card listing important metadata of a television program, attached before the first frame of the program
- 2-pop
