= Film leader =

Length of film attached to its head or tail

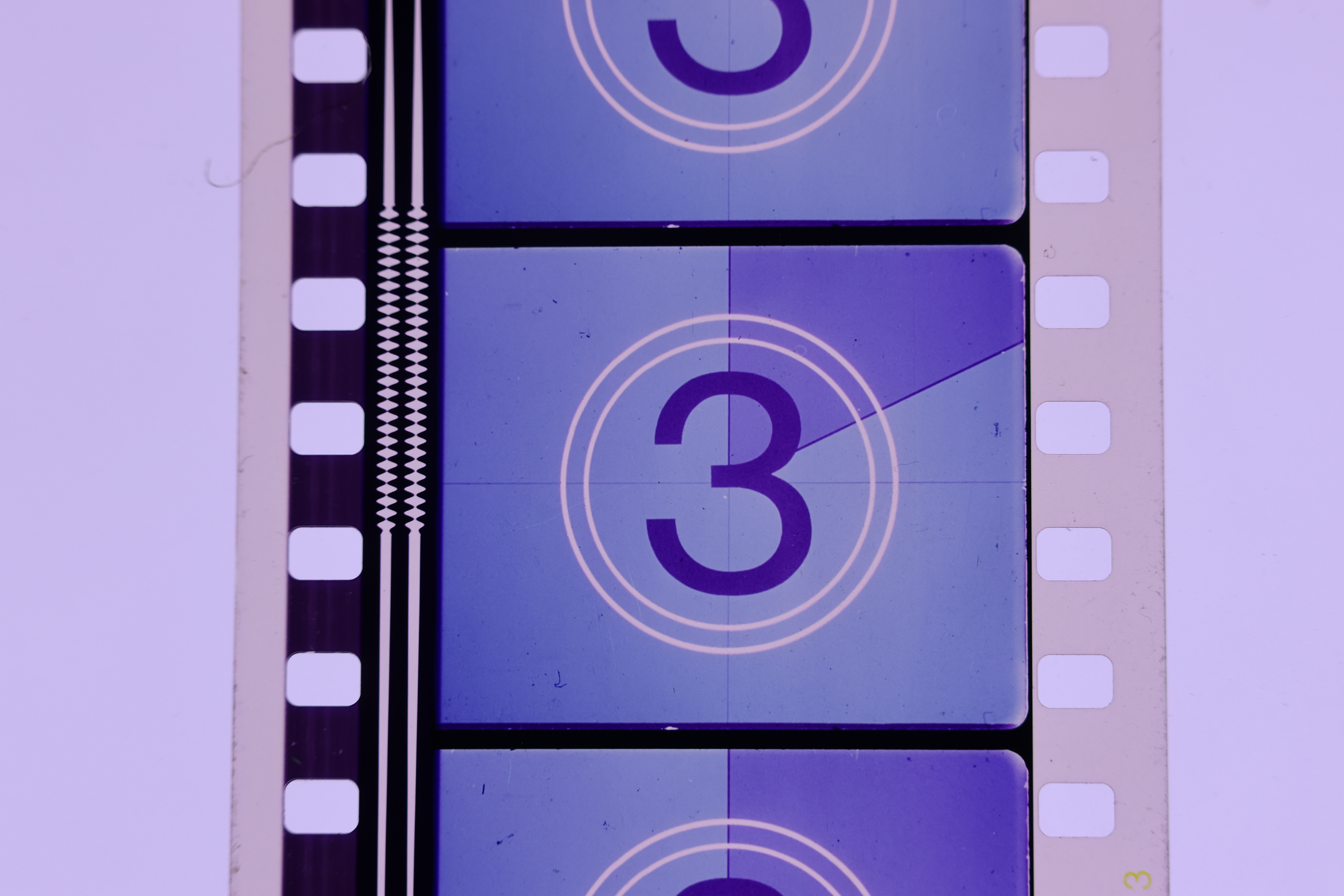
A frame from the countdown portion of a film leader

A film leader is a length of film attached to the head or tail of a film to assist in threading a projector or telecine. A leader attached to the beginning of a reel is sometimes known as a head leader, or simply head, and a leader attached to the end of a reel known as a tail leader or foot leader, or simply tail or foot.

"Film leader", used generically, refers to different types manufactured for many editorial and laboratory uses. For example, some types are used in negative cutting while making A and B rolls for printing. "Painted leader" is perforated film in overall colors, usually white, black, red, blue, or green. These are used for protective head and tail leaders to keep the body of the program material from being damaged. "Fill leader" (also called picture fill, or spacer, or slug film) is used to space out different sections of magnetic audio film stock so they are kept in synchronization with the picture. Typically, this is made from rejected or retired prints of previously released programs.

A countdown leader

A universal film leader is a head leader designed for television and theatrical motion picture exhibition applications. This includes the countdown, and technical information about the film, including title, studio, production number, aspect ratio, sound level and mix, reel number and color.

Head leaders are marked with visual and audio information that may be used to ensure that the correct amount of time is allowed for the machine to run up to speed and arrive at the beginning of the program or movie. They generally feature a countdown.

== Countdown leaders ==
Two versions of the countdown leader are well-known:

Academy Leader
First introduced on November 1, 1930 by the Academy of Motion Picture Arts and Sciences, it has numbers marked once every foot (16 frames per foot in 35 mm film), counting down from 12 to 3. "NINE" and "SIX" are spelled out, to avoid confusion between 6 and 9 when viewed upside-down. The numbers are printed upside down relative to the visual program so as to be right side up when the projectionist is threading a projector. At 3, a quick beep is heard (but this beep is muted on 35mm theatrical release prints to prevent it from being accidentally played in the theater). The Academy leader is specified by SMPTE 301. The standard also specifies the position and placement of the cue marks at the end of the reel.

SMPTE Universal Leader

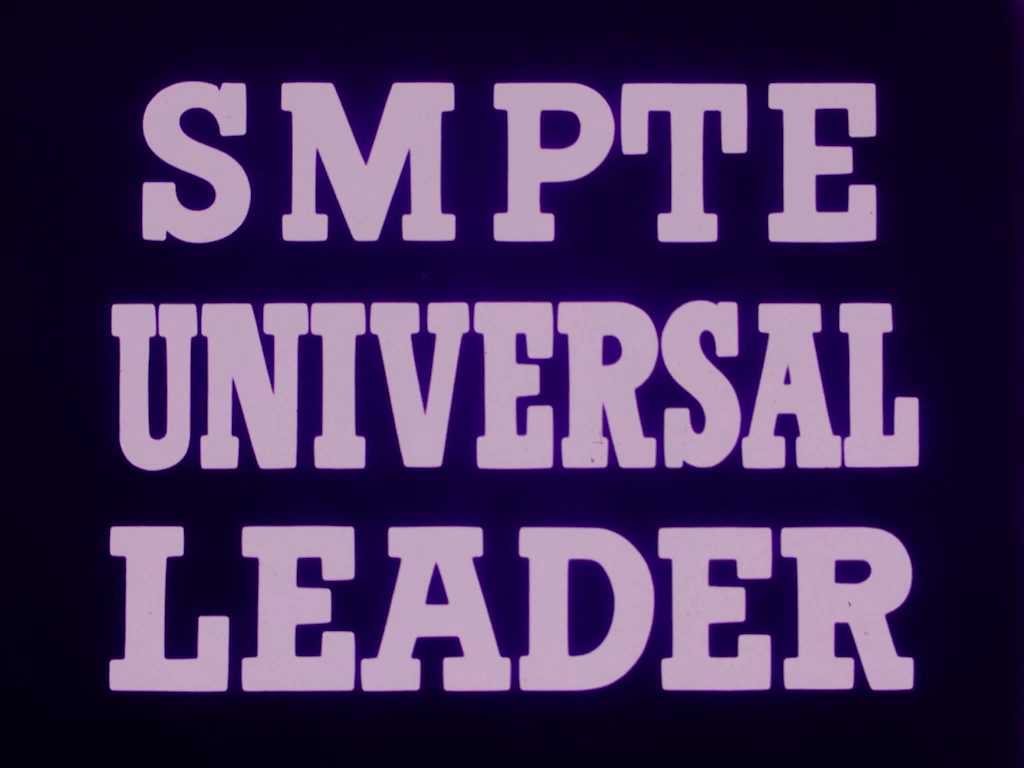
A frame from a SMPTE Universal Leader showing the name of the leader

In the mid-1960s, the Society of Motion Picture and Television Engineers (SMPTE) replaced the Academy Leader with a new style, called the SMPTE Universal Leader, designed for both television and theatrical projection applications (though it did not gain widespread acceptance theatrically). It featured a continuous countdown from 8 to 2 (measured in seconds, rather than feet), with the numbers in the center of a target with two white circles and a rotating "clock arm" animation. At the beginning, before the countdown, it features "16 SOUND START" and then "35 SOUND START" in a circle target. Then "PICTURE START" appears and the countdown begins. The numbers appear right side up when projected on a screen, while the Academy countdown numbers would be upside down. During the four count, the letters "C C F F" would appear around the countdown, signifying the use of those frames as "control frames." At 2, a quick beep would be heard, sometimes known as the "2-pop". The Universal Leader is specified by ANSI/SMPTE 55. The standard also specifies position and placement of the cue marks at the end of the reel. Either by 1992 or 2000, the name of the leader was changed from "Universal Leader" to "Television Leader."

The latest overall length of both styles is the same: in 35mm, 16 feet and 4 frames or 260 frames. The countdown section begins with a single frame bearing the words "Picture Start." The sync beep (or 2-pop) occurs in synchronization with the last numbered frame ("3" on the Academy leader, "2" on the SMPTE Television leader). The length of the countdown section, including the "Picture Start" frame through to and including the "3" foot or "2" second frame, is 9 feet and 1 frame (145 frames) plus 47 frames of black (for a total of 12 feet even or 192 frames).

In 2013, SMPTE introduced the D-Cinema Digital Leader; a picture version of the countdown leader for use with Digital Cinema Distribution Master (DCDM) files. The DCDM is the penultimate step to the creation of the Digital Cinema Package (DCP). Unlike the previous film standards, no provision is made for changeover cue marks because digital cinema files are continuous.

== Previous versions ==
Society Leader
Introduced in 1951 by SMPTE, it was a modification of the "Academy leader" in order to work better with the film chains most TV stations were then using. The numbers still counted down once every foot, from 11 to 3, but instead of being upside down relative to the main program visuals, the numbers were right side up. Furthermore, instead of there being just black film in between the numbers, Society leader had a crosshair pattern to help with television framing and focusing. This style of countdown leader did not receive a separate standard identification. It was completely replaced by the SMPTE Universal leader.

- The Academy leader was revised in April 1934. The revision shifted the changeover cue marks earlier by 6 frames. After the second world war, the 1934 format was accepted by American Standards Association, the precursor to ANSI, and given the designation ASA Z22.55-1947, "Specification for 35-Millimeter Sound Motion Picture Release Prints in Standard 2000-Foot Lengths." This standard was intended to be supplanted by the SMPTE Universal Leader, introduced in 1965–66. But once it was realized that theater projectionists were not going to accept the new format, the traditional Academy format was given a new code: SMPTE 301.
- The original SMPTE Universal leader had a middle gray density for the overall background and the 47 frames between the 2 frame and the first frame of picture. Subsequent revisions darkened this to black in order to encourage adoption of the leader by theatrical projectionists.

== See also ==
- China girl (filmmaking)
- Slate (broadcasting)
