= Blanking level =

Characteristic of a video signal

In video technology, blanking level is the level of the composite video signal during the front and back porches of the video signal.

The composite video signal is actually the video information superimposed on blanking. The total level of the composite video signal (blanking + video) is 1000 mV. This level can also be given in IRE units such that the level difference reserved for video information is 100 IRE units. So white corresponds to 100 IRE units and blanking level corresponds to 0 IRE units. The level of black is 0 IRE units in the case of CCIR System B and CCIR System G (European systems) and 7.5 IRE units in the case of CCIR System M (American system), although NTSC-J in Japan, also utilizing System M, uses 0 IRE for both black and blanking much like Systems B & G. So, while there is no difference between the black and the blanking levels in most systems, they differ by 50 mV in system M. (When defined in terms of voltage difference, 7.5 IRE units is almost equal to 50 mV.)
