= EIAJ MTS =

EIAJ MTS is a multichannel television sound standard created by the EIAJ.

Bilingual and stereo sound television programs started being broadcast in Japan in October 1978 using an "FM-FM" system originally developed by the NHK Technical Research Labs during 1962–1969. This system was modified and standardised by the EIAJ in January 1979. Television stations in Japan with capability for bilingual and stereo sound transmissions used the callsign JO**-TAM, where "TAM" denotes their audio FM multiplex sub-carrier designation, until digital switchover to ISDB-T in 2010–2012 which eventually rendered EIAJ MTS obsolete.

The original System M TV standard has a monaural FM transmission at 4.5 MHz. For Japanese multichannel television sound a second channel, or sub-channel, is added to the original signal by using an FM sub-carrier at twice the line frequency (Fh, or 15374 Hz). In order to identify the different modes (mono, stereo, or dual sound) a pilot tone is also added on an AM carrier at 3.5 times the line frequency. The pilot tone frequencies are 982.5 Hz for stereo and 922.5 Hz for dual sound. Contrary to Zweikanalton these pilot tones are not coupled to the line frequency but were instead chosen to allow use of filters already employed in the Pocket Bell pager system.

== See also ==
- Multichannel Television Sound (3 additional audio channels on 4.5 MHz audio carriers)
- NICAM
- Zweikanalton A2
