= 2-pop =

Brief 1 kHz tone

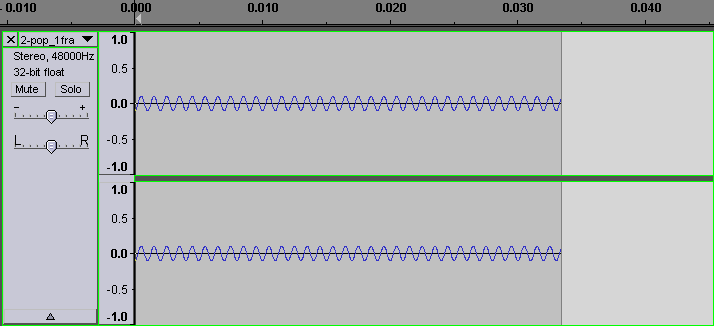
Waveform of one frame (1/30th of a second) of 1 kHz sound

Used in television production and filmmaking post-production, a 2-pop is a 1 kHz tone that is one frame long and placed 2 seconds before the start of a program. It is a simple and effective method of ensuring synchronization between sound and picture in a video or film.

A 2-pop is typically placed at the end of a visual countdown. Only the first frame of the "2" is shown, and the remainder of the 2 seconds prior to the program is black. This provides a unique point of reference where the frame-long image and frame-long sound should align, similar to the way a film clapperboard is used to generate a synchronization point.

For example, in a television or video program the first frame of action (FFOA) starts at one hour (typically timecode of 01:00:00:00 in the US, and 10:00:00:00 in the UK), preceding that, 1 frame (or the 2-pop) of tone would be placed at timecode 00:59:58:00 or exactly 2 seconds before first picture. Alternately, in film post-production the leader starts at 01:00:00:00 (or 0+00 feet if using feet and frames as is common in the United States), the 2-pop starts at 01:00:06:00 (or 9+00), and the first frame of action (FFOA) starts at 01:00:08:00 (or 12+00).

A 2-pop is useful whenever picture and sound are handled separately. For example, projecting work-in-progress in the pre-video days involved a film projector linked to a magnetic dubber, onto which the separate soundtrack reel was loaded. Aligning them by the 2-pop would ensure proper synchronization during playback. A modern scenario would involve sending a soundtrack to a separate facility for a sound mix. The returned product is a computer audio file, which then needs to be synchronized again with the picture.

== Sample sound ==
1 frame of 1 kHz audio
2-pop's sound frequency and duration

Whereas laying down bars and tone prior to program start establishes video and audio calibration levels on the tape, the 2-pop is primarily used for picture and sound synchronization. Therefore, while the loudness of the 2-pop may be the same as the bars and tone audio level in use, this is not a requirement. The loudness level should be sufficient to be heard clearly.
