= IRE (unit) =

Video signal feature

Diagram of NTSC video field with IRE measurements

The IRE unit is used in the measurement of analog video signals. Its name is derived from the initials of the Institute of Radio Engineers.

A value of 100 IRE is defined to be +714 mV in an analog NTSC video signal. A value of 0 IRE corresponds to the voltage value of 0 mV, the signal value during the blanking period. The sync pulse is normally 40 IRE below this 0 IRE value, so the total range covered from peak to trough of an all white signal would be 140 IRE.

Video signals use the "IRE" unit instead of DC voltages to describe levels and amplitudes. Based on a standard 1 V_{pp} NTSC composite-video signal that swings from -286 mV (sync tip) to +714 mV (peak video), a 140 IRE peak-to-peak convention is established. Thus, one NTSC IRE unit is 7.143 mV (1/140 V), where -40 IRE is equivalent to -285.7 mV, and +100 IRE is equivalent to +714.3 mV. 0 IRE is equivalent to 0 V. The black level is equivalent to 53.57 mV (7.5 IRE) in NTSC-M.

The PAL video signal is slightly different in that it swings from -300 mV to +700 mV instead. Thus, one PAL IRE unit is 7 mV, where -43 IRE is equivalent to -300 mV at the sync tip, and +100 IRE is equivalent to +700 mV at the peak video level. Black level is the same as the blanking level 0 mV (0 IRE).

== IRE in different systems ==
The reason IRE is a relative measurement (percent) is that a video signal may be any amplitude. This unit is used in the ITU recommendations BT.470 and BT.1701 which define PAL, NTSC and SECAM:

	Sync level		Blanking level	Ref. black		Peak white		Peak w/ chrom.	Color burst amplitude
	(IRE)	(mv)	(IRE and mV)	(IRE)	(mv)	(IRE)	(mv)	(IRE)	(IRE)
NTSC-M	-40	-285.7	0	+7.5	+51.43	+100	+714.3	120	40
NTSC-J	-40	-285.7	0	0	0	+100	+714.3	120	40
PAL-B/G	-43	-300	0	0	0	+100	+700	133	43
SECAM	-43	-300	0	0	0	+100	+700	130	N/A

Notes:

- All voltages levels are relative. Non-zero values with a sign (+ or -) in front indicates a level; those without indicate an amplitude or distance.

The image at the start of the article uses the sync level instead of the blanking level as the zero point. It also mentions an LSB unit, in this context defined as 92.5/256 IRE: this corresponds to the magnitude represented by a least significant bit change when representing the brightness as an 8-bit digital signal. The expanded limit at 110 IRE and the idea of a separate "reference white" are common extensions beyond the standard.

=== Specifications ===
BT.470.1 to BT.470.6 define characteristics of both the in-studio signals and broadcast signals. BT.470.7 delegates these to BT.1700 (for in-studio) and BT.1701 (for broadcast). Different constraints may apply.

For example, SMPTE 170M-2004 (which BT.1700 delegates to for NTSC) defines not only composite signals, but also component signals with different voltage levels (700 mV white).

=== Peak levels ===
There are two peak levels to be distinguished: a luminance-only peak white for the highlight headroom and a peak-with-chrominance value that also accounts for the addition of a color subcarrier.

The IRE values are largely based on BT.470.6 table 1 "basic characteristics", which does not take into account broadcast. In all cases the peak-white is set at 100 IRE. The peak-with-chrominance is higher due to the amplitude of the subcarrier. For CCIR System M, BT.470.6 table 1 gives a limit of 120 IRE. SMPTE 170M-2004 gives a broader limit of 131 IRE.

BT.1701.1 table 1, which corresponds to BT.470.6 table 3, describes how the amplitudes are modulated onto the radiated TV signal.

=== Burst amplitude ===
Unlike the National Instruments reference and like the ITU references, burst amplitudes are reported as peak-to-peak. See Amplitude § Definitions. These values are taken from BT.1700.

Instead of a color burst, SECAM uses trapezoid-shaped color identification signals of 50 IRE (Db') or 54 IRE (Dr') peak-to-peak.
