= EIA 1956 resolution chart =

Test card designed in 1956 to be used with black and white analogue TV systems

EIA 1956 video resolution target

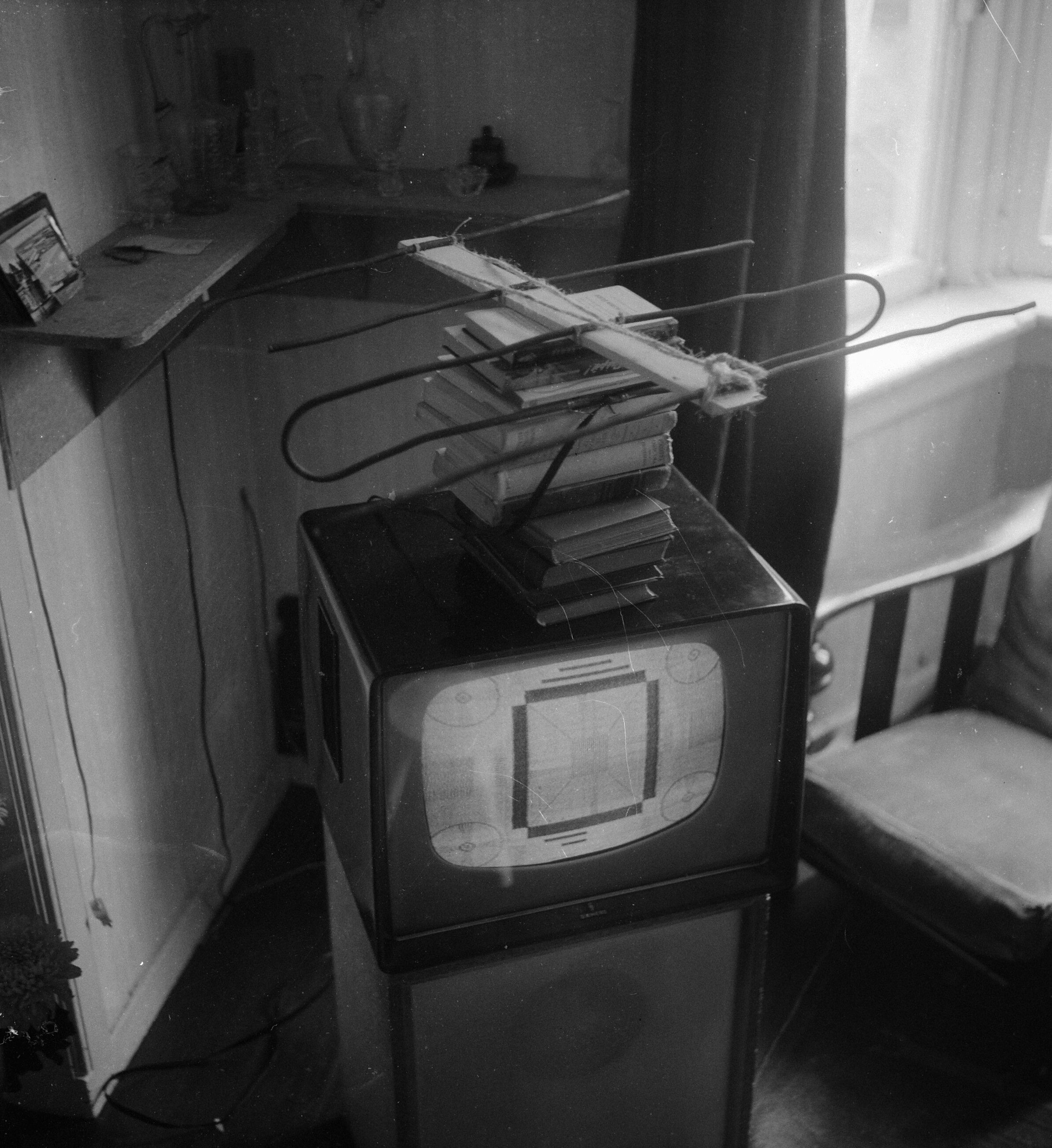
Off-air photo of EIA 1956 test card being broadcast by offshore pirate station TV Noordzee, 12 August 1964

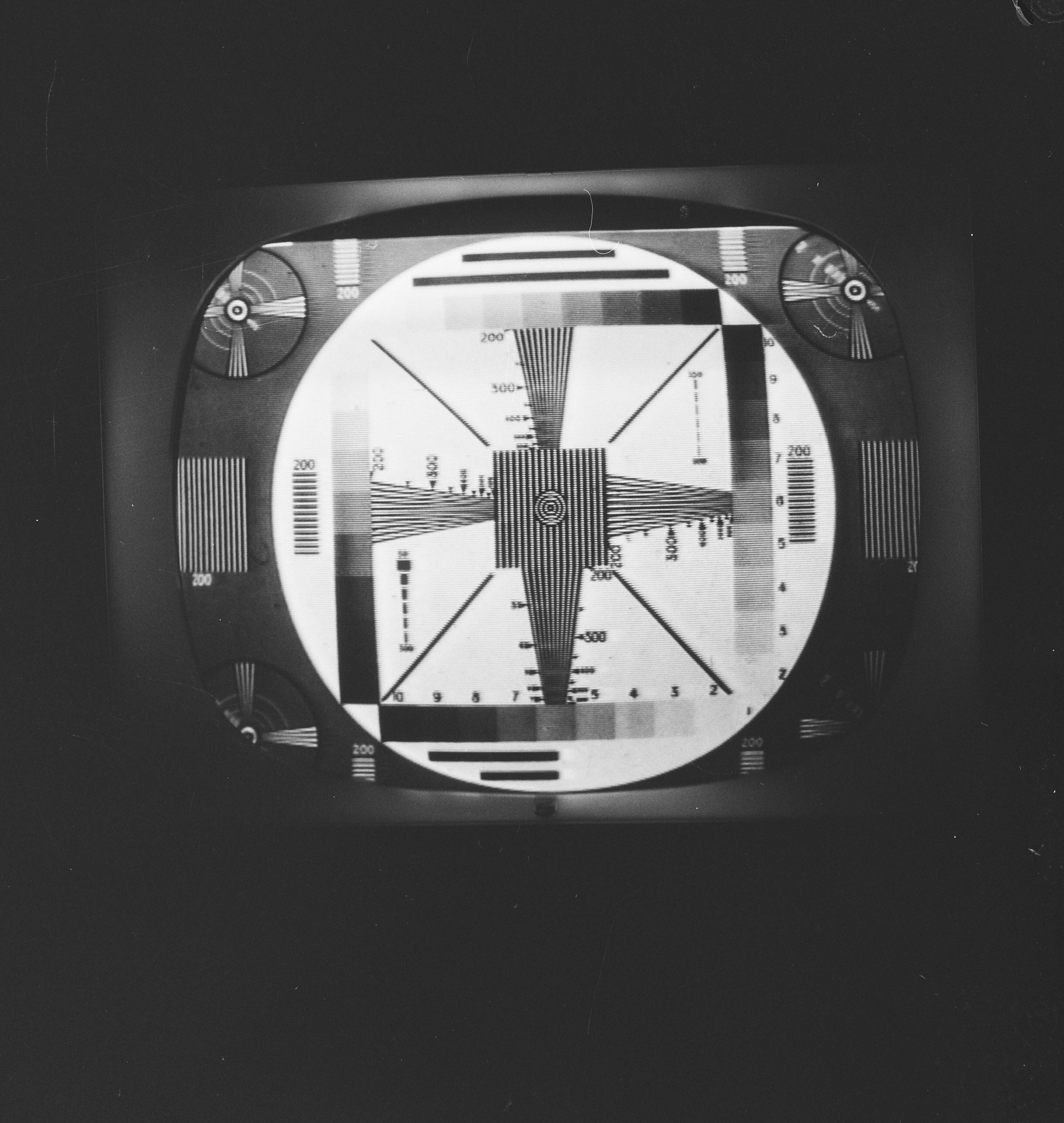
Off-air photo of RMA 1946 Resolution Chart being broadcast by Dutch public broadcaster NTS, 7 September 1961

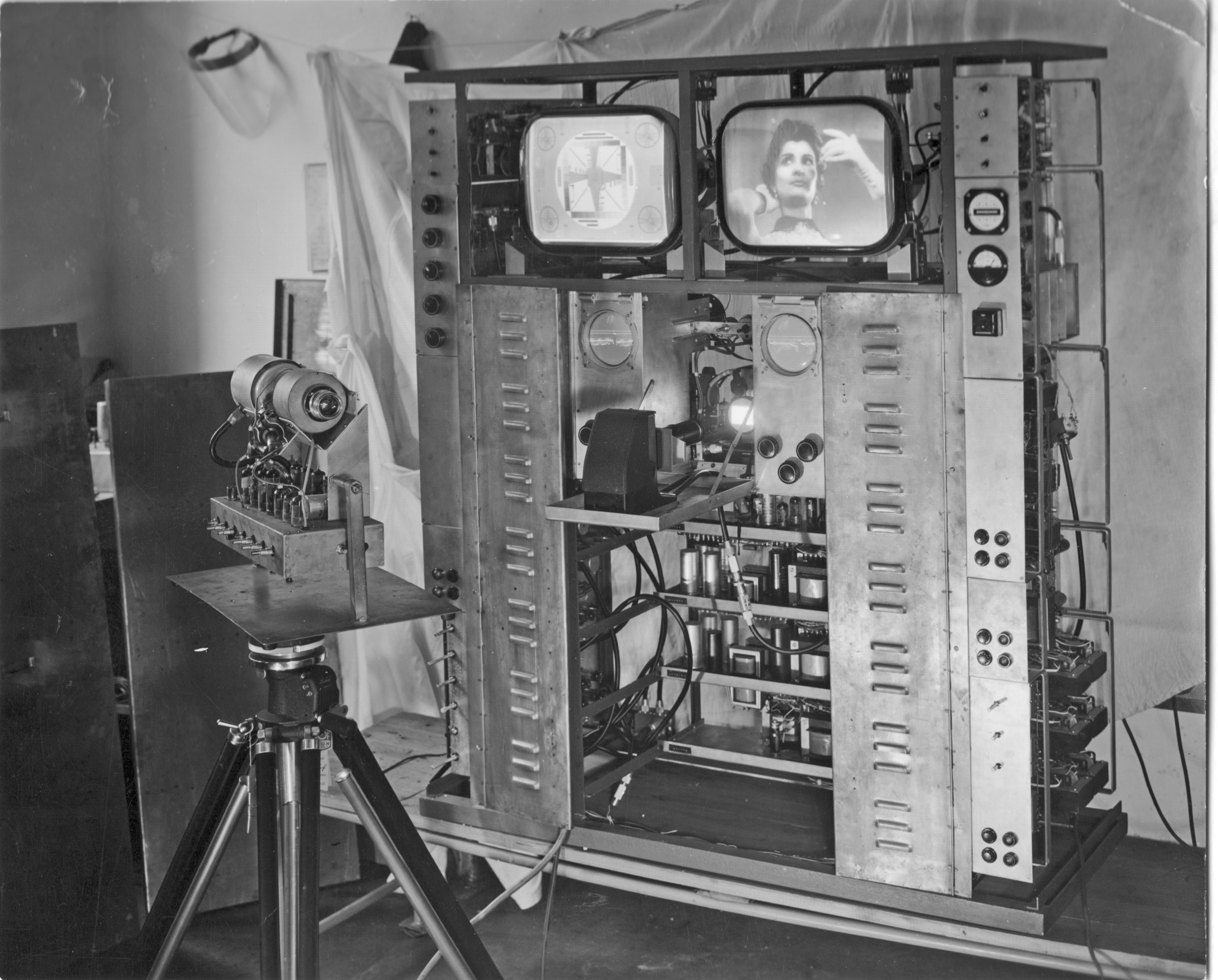
Grundig TV laboratory in 1952 with top left screen showing a RMA 1946 Resolution Chart

The EIA 1956 Resolution Chart (until 1975 called RETMA Resolution Chart 1956) is a test card originally designed in 1956 to be used with black and white analogue TV systems, based on the previous (and very similar) RMA 1946 Resolution Chart. It consisted of a printed chart filmed by a TV camera or monoscope to be displayed on a TV screen, and was also available as individual rolls of test film to test broadcasting equipment. Inspecting the chart allowed to check for defects like ringing, geometric distortions, raster scan linearity, cathode-ray tube uniformity and lack of image resolution. If needed, a technician could use it to perform the necessary hardware adjustments.

Today, this chart continues to be used to measure image resolution of modern cameras and lenses and also in scientific research.

== Features and operation ==
The chart is composed of several features, each designed for a specific test:

- Large white circle: Allows for image geometry adjustments (image should be centered with the circles being perfectly round).
- Vertical stripe boxes: A grating with a resolution of 200 Television Lines (TVL), a measurement of image resolution on analogue TV systems, allowing adjustment of horizontal linearity and geometry.
- Horizontal stripe boxes: A grating, allowing adjustment of vertical linearity.
- Grayscale steps: Evaluating gamma and transfer characteristics, they allow for contrast and brightness adjustments (at least 6 to 8 steps should be visible)
- Concentric circles: Allow to test cathode-ray beam sharpness and focus
- Resolution wedges: The gradually expanding lines near the center, labeled with periodic indications of the corresponding spatial frequency, allow checking of image resolution.
- Border arrows: Allow for overscan adjustments.
- Numbers: Going from 200 to 800, they correspond to TV Lines (TVL).

Used with early monochrome TV systems, this chart was useful in measuring image resolution, determined by inspection of the image as displayed on a CRT. On such systems an important measure is the limiting horizontal resolution, affected by hardware and transmission quality (vertical resolution is fixed and determined by the video standard used, usually 525 lines or 625 lines).

== Usage ==
=== RMA 1946 Resolution Chart ===
The RMA 1946 Resolution Chart was transmitted by NTS and NOS in the Netherlands, SRG SSR in Switzerland, VRT and RTBF in Belgium, RTP in Portugal, TVP in Poland, TVB in Hong Kong, Venevisión in Venezuela (525-lines variant; in conjunction with Indian-head test pattern), WISN-TV in Milwaukee, Wisconsin (525-lines variant) and on low-powered experimental transmissions by Philips Natuurkundig Laboratorium in Eindhoven (NL) and Istanbul University in Turkey.

=== EIA 1956 resolution chart ===
The EIA 1956 resolution chart was transmitted by NRK in Norway (in conjunction with the monochrome Pye Test Card G), CKCK-TV in Saskatchewan, Canada (525-lines variant), CERTV in the Dominican Republic (525-lines variant), KRMA-TV, KVVV-TV, WVIZ-TV, WHYY-TV and WUAB-TV in the United States (525-lines variant; WUAB-TV's version later partially overlaid on SMPTE color bars), RTBF and VRT in Belgium, NTS in the Netherlands, Magyar Televízió in Hungary, TVP in Poland, American Forces Network in West Germany (525-lines variant, sometimes also with the centre portion overlaid on top of Multiburst test pattern), Yugoslav Radio Television in the former SFR Yugoslavia, Rediffusion Television in British Hong Kong (where it replaced a modified version of the 1950s Marconi-designed Associated-Rediffusion "diamond" test card), ERTU in Egypt and ORTAS in Syria. It was also used by the pirate TV Noordzee station broadcasting to the Netherlands in the 1960s.

This chart, in conjunction with the RMA 1946 Resolution Chart and later widescreen patterns, is commonly used to test consumer and professional standalone, smartphone and tablet cameras for photo and videography and other imaging equipment like microscopes or CCTV cameras.

== Variations ==
Some variations of the EIA resolution test chart exist. Two Japanese variants of the EIA 1956 resolution chart are called "ITE Resolution Chart /EIAJ Test Chart A" and "JEITA Test Chart II". A widescreen update of the EIA 1956 resolution chart was developed around the 1980s for the HD-MAC broadcasting standard, which was later modified by the Institute of Image Information and Television Engineers of Japan as its ITE Resolution Chart for High-definition Televisions.

=== Telefunken T 05 ===
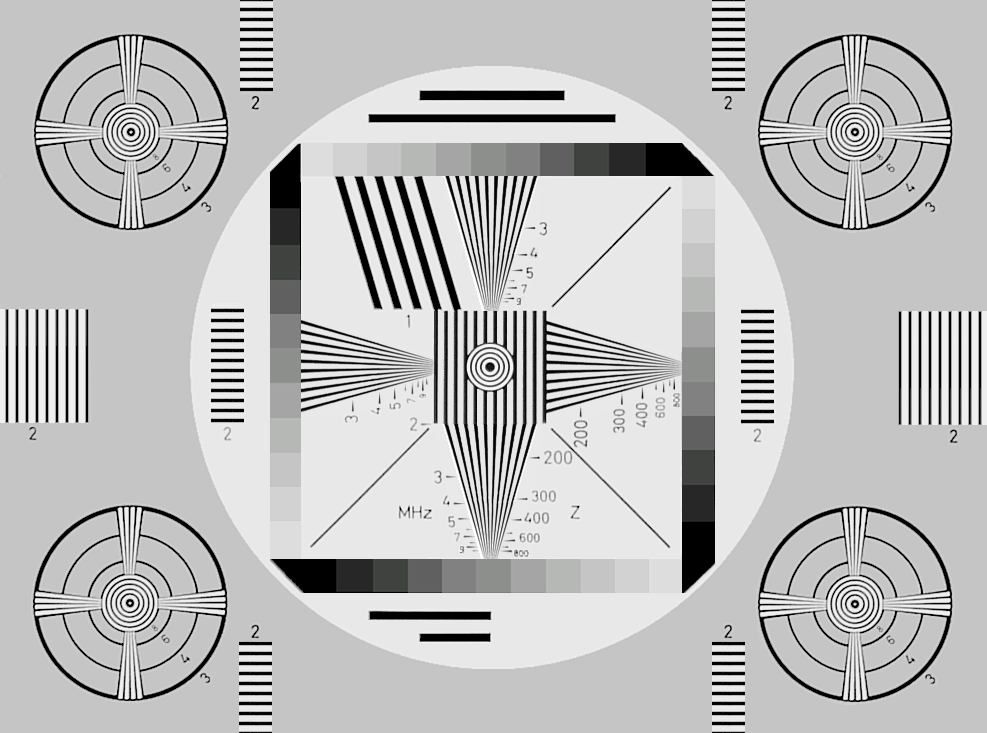
Recreation of Telefunken Test Card T05

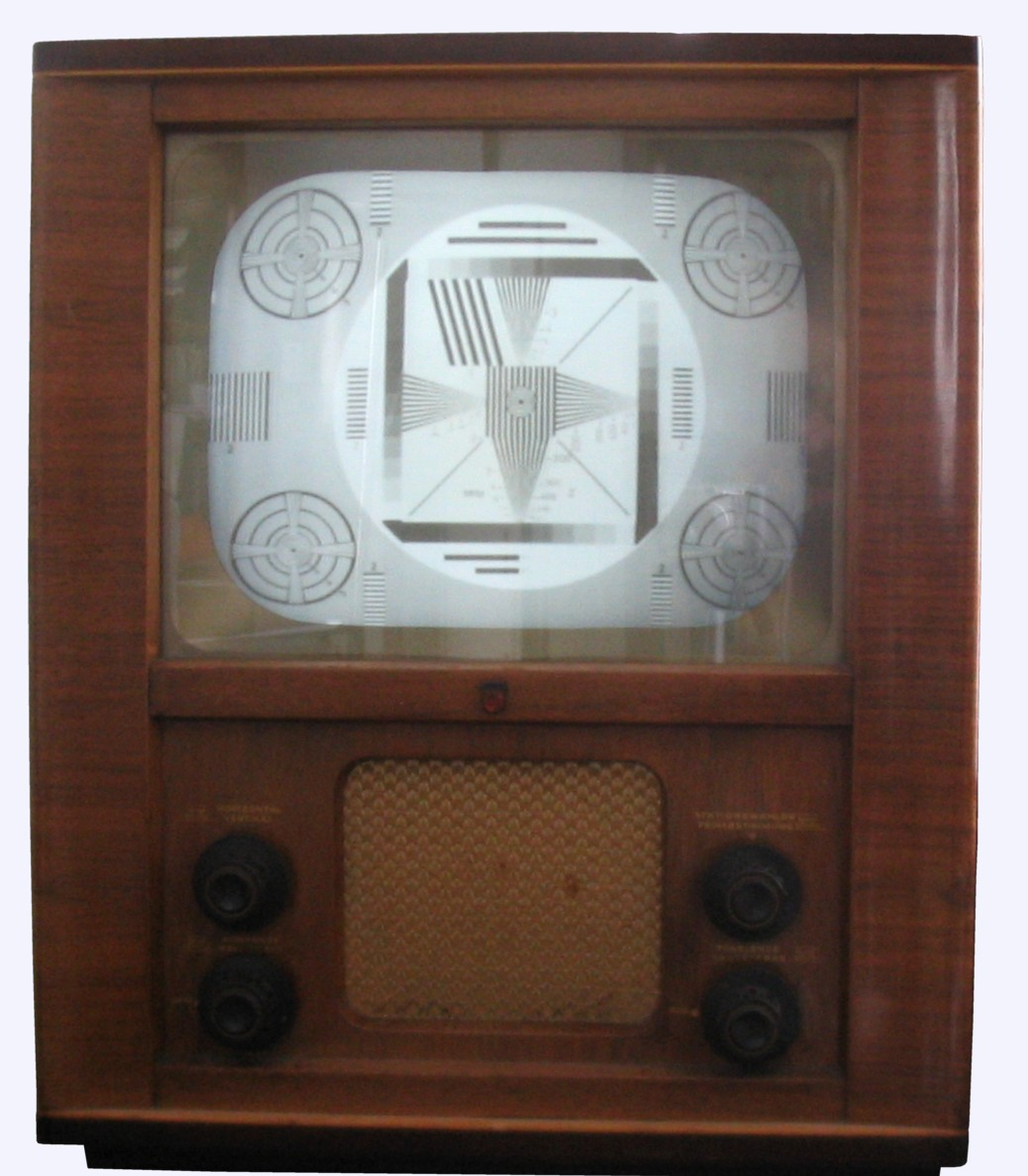
A Philips "Starenkasten" 1952 TV set, displaying the Telefunken T05 test card.

In continental Europe, another variation known as Telefunken Test Card T05 was used. It had five diagonal bars on the top left of the centre white circle and different resolution wedges reminiscent of the RMA 1946 Resolution Chart. It was also available as individual rolls of test film, particularly in the DACH countries. As a test card, it was used on ARD (from the 1950s up to the 1970s), Hessischer Rundfunk, Bayerischer Rundfunk, WDR, NWRV in northern Germany, Yugoslav Radio Television, Österreichischer Rundfunk in Austria, BRT in Belgium, Doordarshan in India, some commercial TV stations in Australia, TVE in Spain, Israel Broadcasting Authority and Israeli Educational Television in Israel, TRT in Turkey, and in early-1950s trial television tests by the KTH Royal Institute of Technology in Stockholm, Sweden.

The centre portion of the Telefunken T05 test card was depicted on the obverse side of the 50 Years of Television commemorative coin minted on 9 March 2005 in Austria.

== In popular culture ==
The centre portion of the RMA 1946 Resolution Chart was featured on the cover of Die Kreuzen's 7" single of Pink Flag/Land of Treason, released in 1990.

== See also ==
- Television lines
- Philips PM5540
- Indian-head test pattern
- Test card
