= Test film =

Photographic film for testing equipment quality

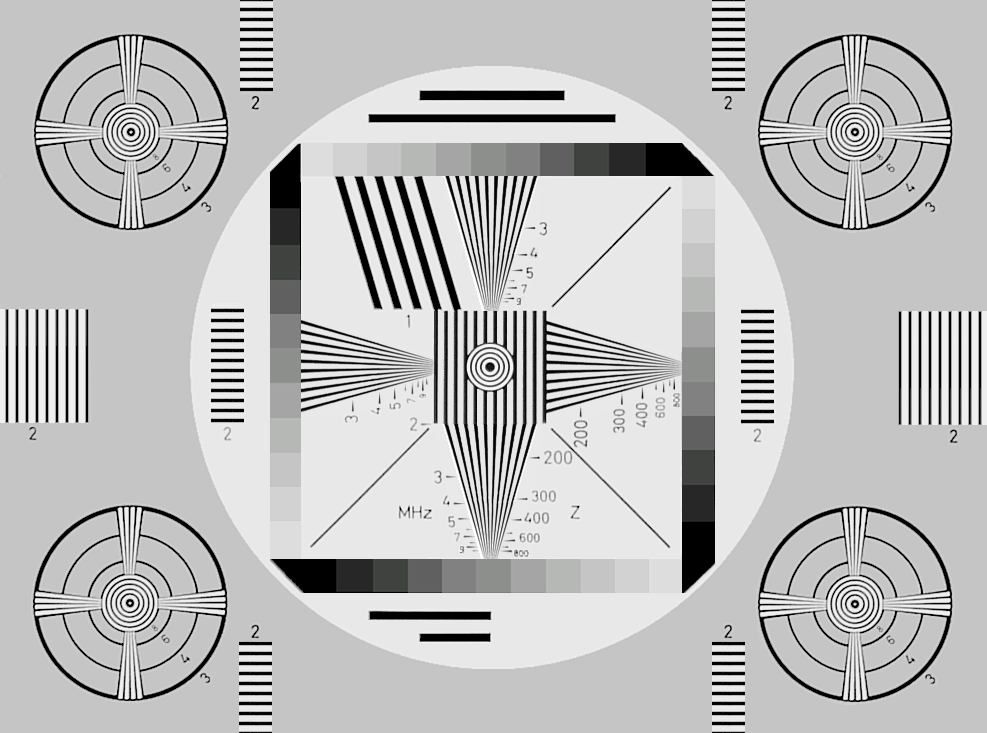
Recreation of Telefunken T05 test card, also used as a test film in the DACH, showing Resolution, Registration, Geometry and grey tests

ТИТ-0249 test card, also used as a test film in the Soviet Union

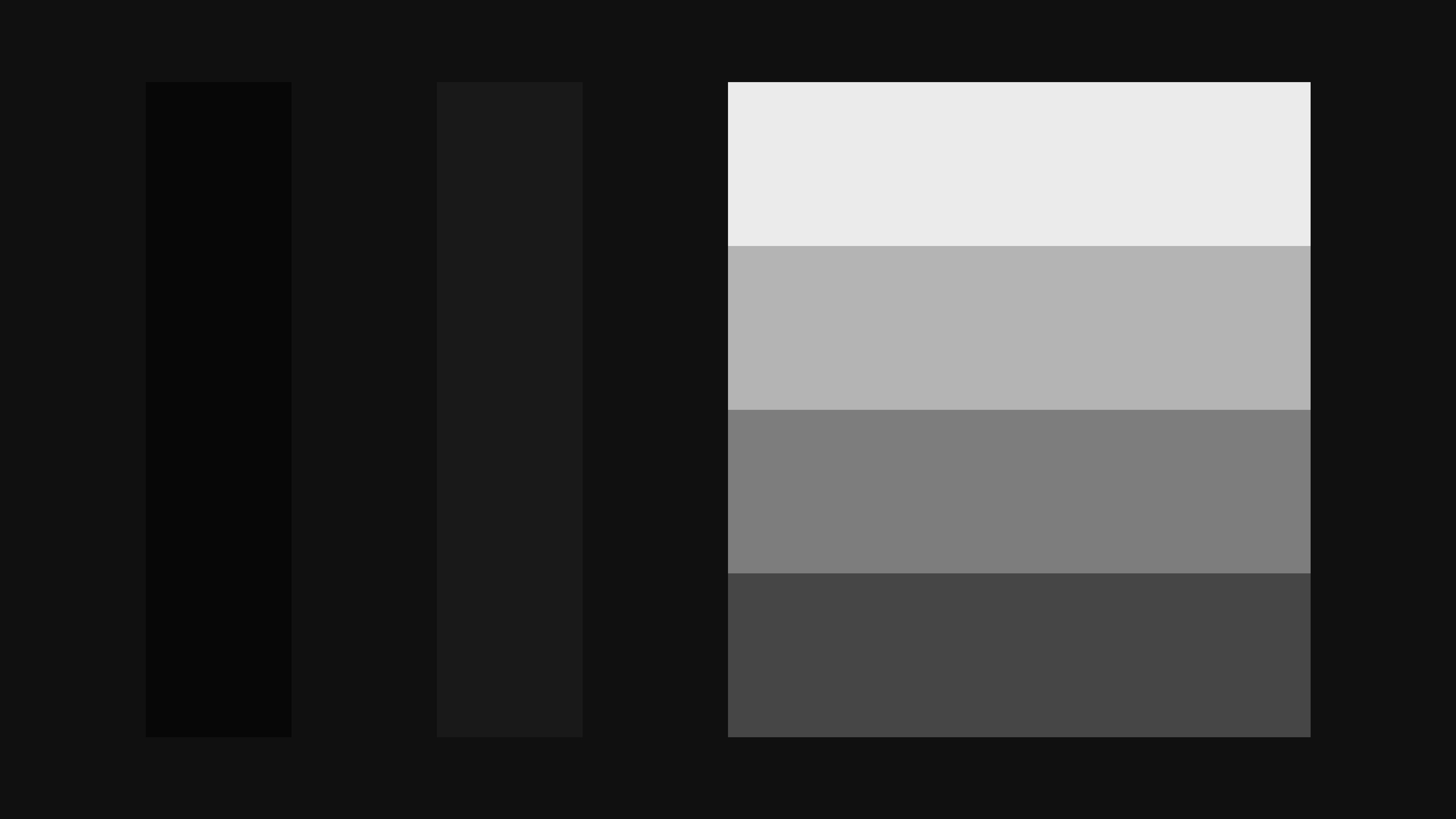
PLUGE, one type of low light test

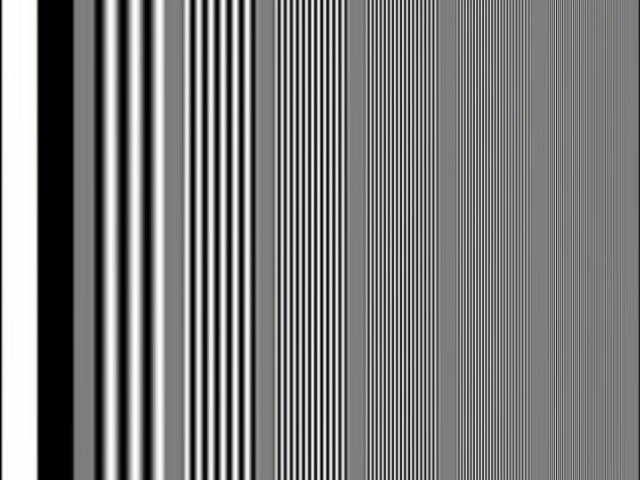
Multiburst, one type of Resolution test

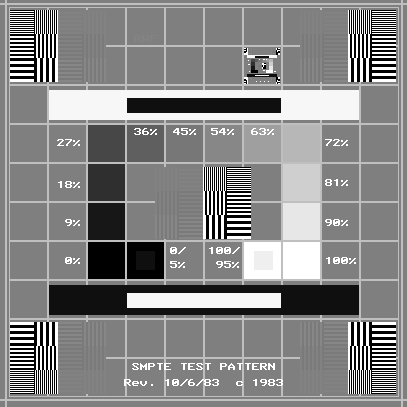
SMPTE RP-133 imaging Test Pattern used to calibrate and test medical imaging equipment

Test film are rolls or loops or slides of photographic film used for testing the quality of equipment. Equipment to be tested could include: telecine, motion picture film scanner, Movie projectors, Image scanners, film-out gear, Film recorders and Film scanners.

Test films comes in all film formats: 16mm, 35mm, Super 8, 8mm, 65mm, 70mm and IMAX, both motion pictures and still photography.

== China girl ==
China girl, leader ladies, LAD girl or laboratory aim density (LAD) test film, is common name for a color chart test film with a color or black-and-white set up chart and a woman. This would be used stand alone or placed on a film leader, that is at the start of the first roll of film. An LAD patch is neutral gray, with visual density of 1.0. With the LAD patch is usually a white and black patch for white balancing films.

Color patches of blue, green, and red are used to check saturated colors. Grayscale chips are used to check for neutral color balance and correct contrast. While the face is used for color correct flesh tones, LAD film is a few frames or a loop of correctly exposed and processed negative film that is used by a film laboratory to set-up their analyzers. This is to ensure that the duplication and printing processes of the film is correct.

== Types ==
- Resolution – focus
- Registration and geometry
- Framing and aspect ratio
- Negative pulldown – 2, 3 or 4 perforation
- Color grading
- TAF – Telecine Analysis film (Kodak Telecine tool kit)
- Steadiness – film perforations test
- Streaking or after glow
- Keykode – film frame number test
- Optical sound focus
- Optical sound buzz (centered audio pick)
- Magnetic sound
- Dolby tone sound

== Manufactures ==
(past and current):

- SMPTE -Society of Motion Picture and Television Engineers
- Kodak
- Fujifilm
- D.E.L. test film
- BBC and Channel 4 UK
- European Broadcasting Union – EBU
- International Electrotechnical Commission – IEC
- ARRI
- Fernseh – Broadcast Television Systems Inc.
- Dolby (Audio only)

== See also ==
- Testcard for TV and Computer monitor
- List of BBC test cards
- List of film topics (Extensive alphabetical listing)
- SMPTE colour bars
- Film analysis
- SMPTE Universal Leader
- Digital Picture Exchange
- 1951 USAF resolution test chart
- Optical resolution
- Snellen chart
- List of monochrome and RGB palettes
- Indexed color
- Color Lookup Table
- Computer display
- Grayscale
- 3D LUT
- Glossary of video terms

== Images ==
EIA 1956 resolution chart

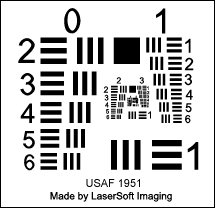
SilverFast USAF 1951Resolution Target by LaserSoft Imaging

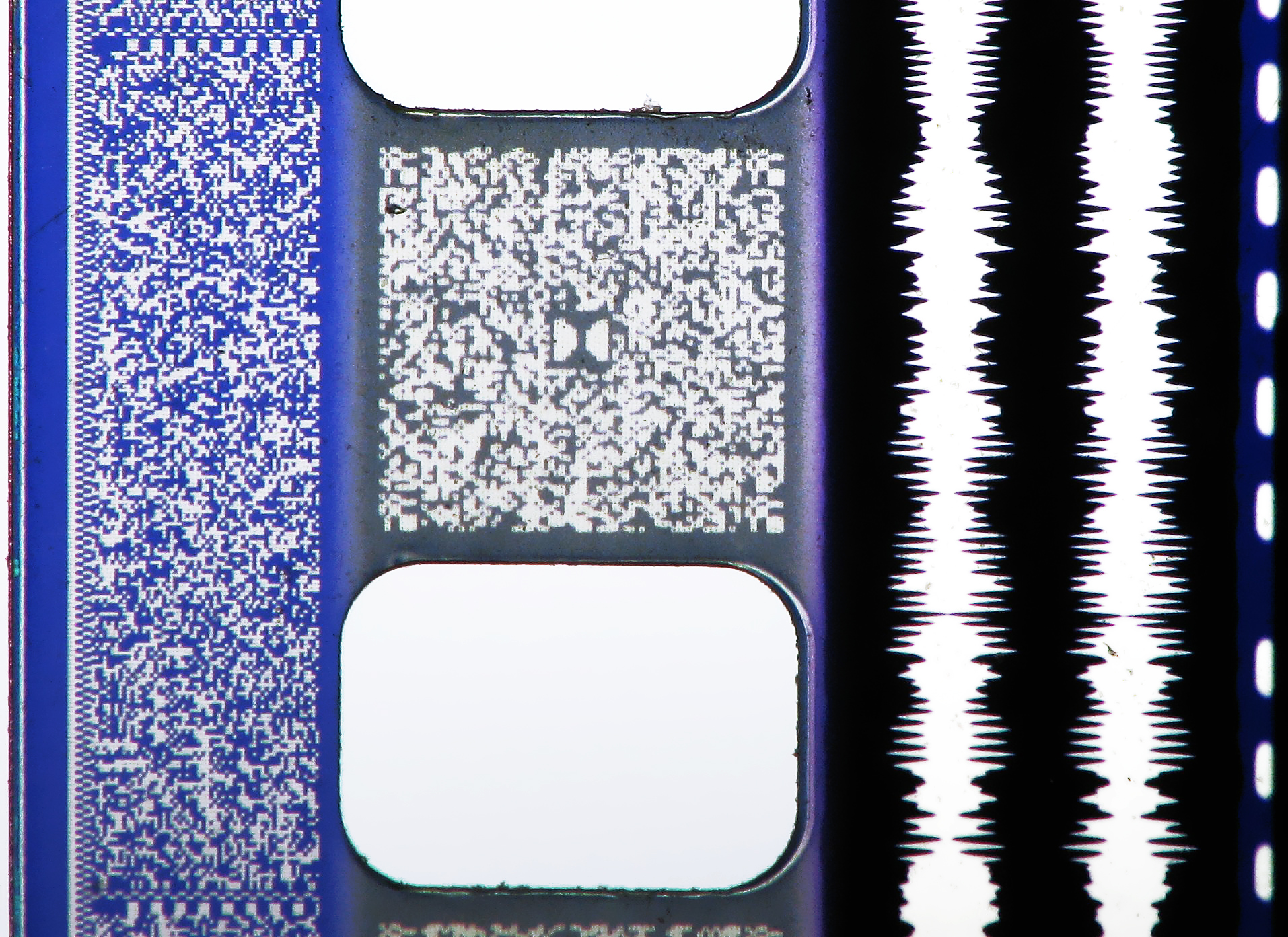
35mm film sound

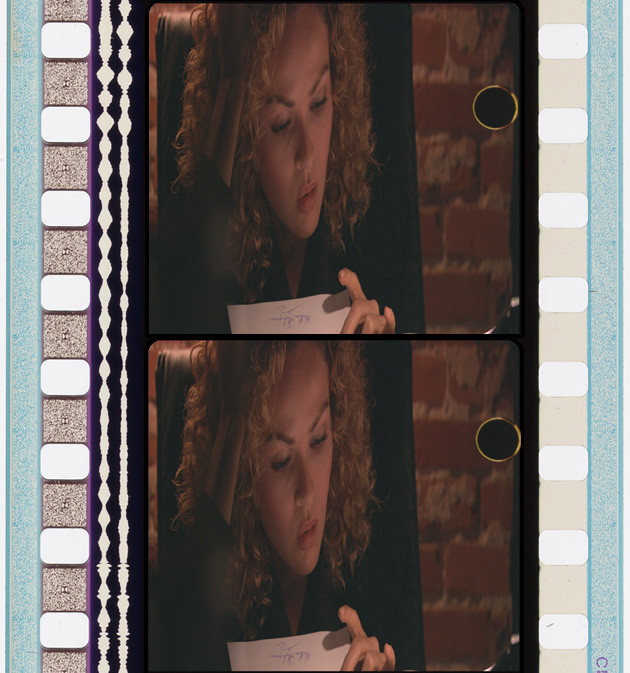
Anamorphic Film with Stereo sound

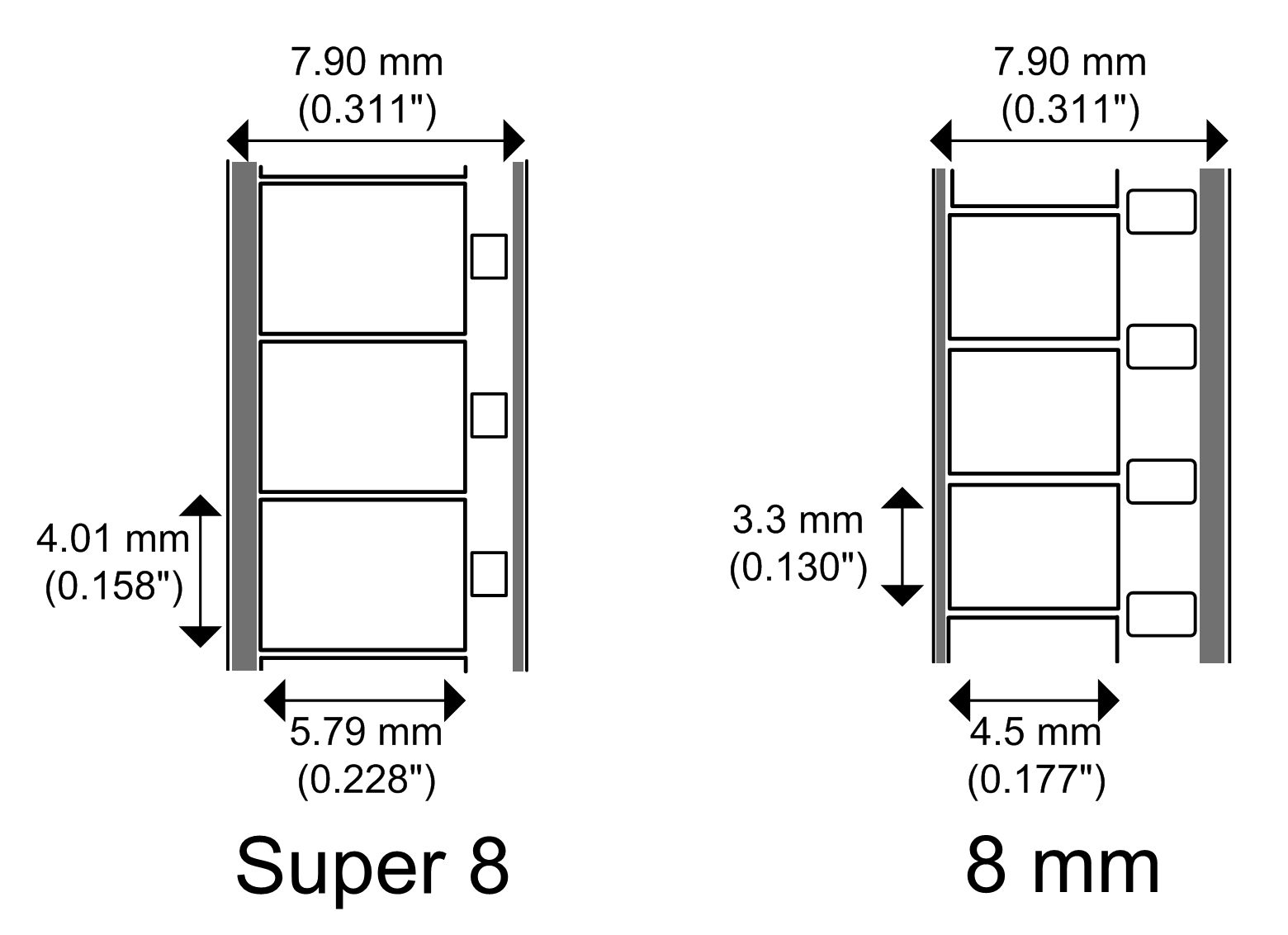
8mm and Super 8 film framing

35mm film common formats

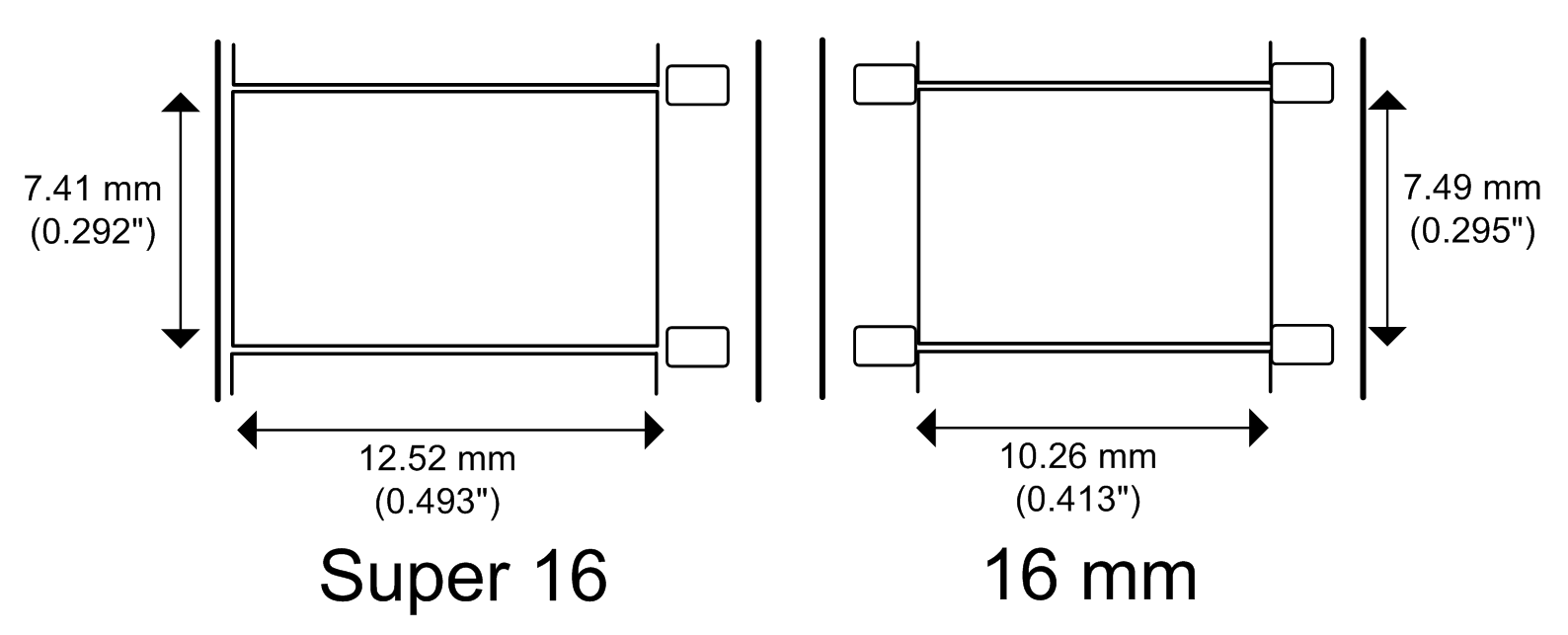
16mm film common formats

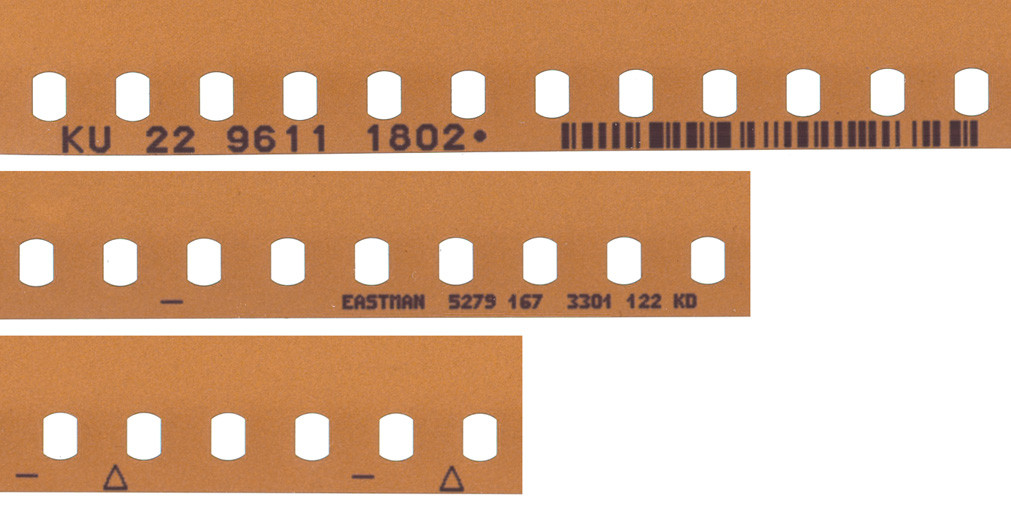
Keykode-edgecode

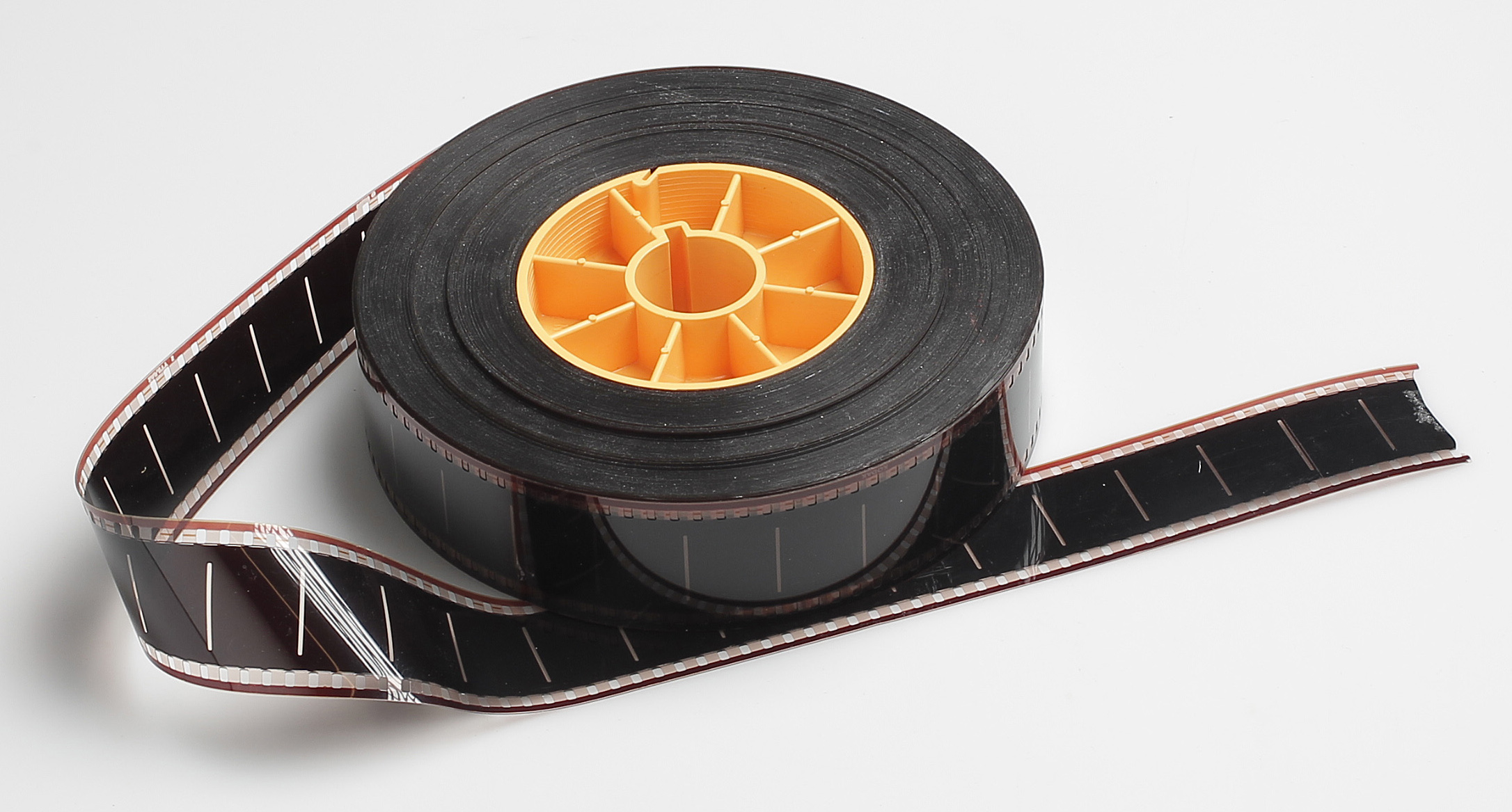
35mm motion picture film roll on bobbin core

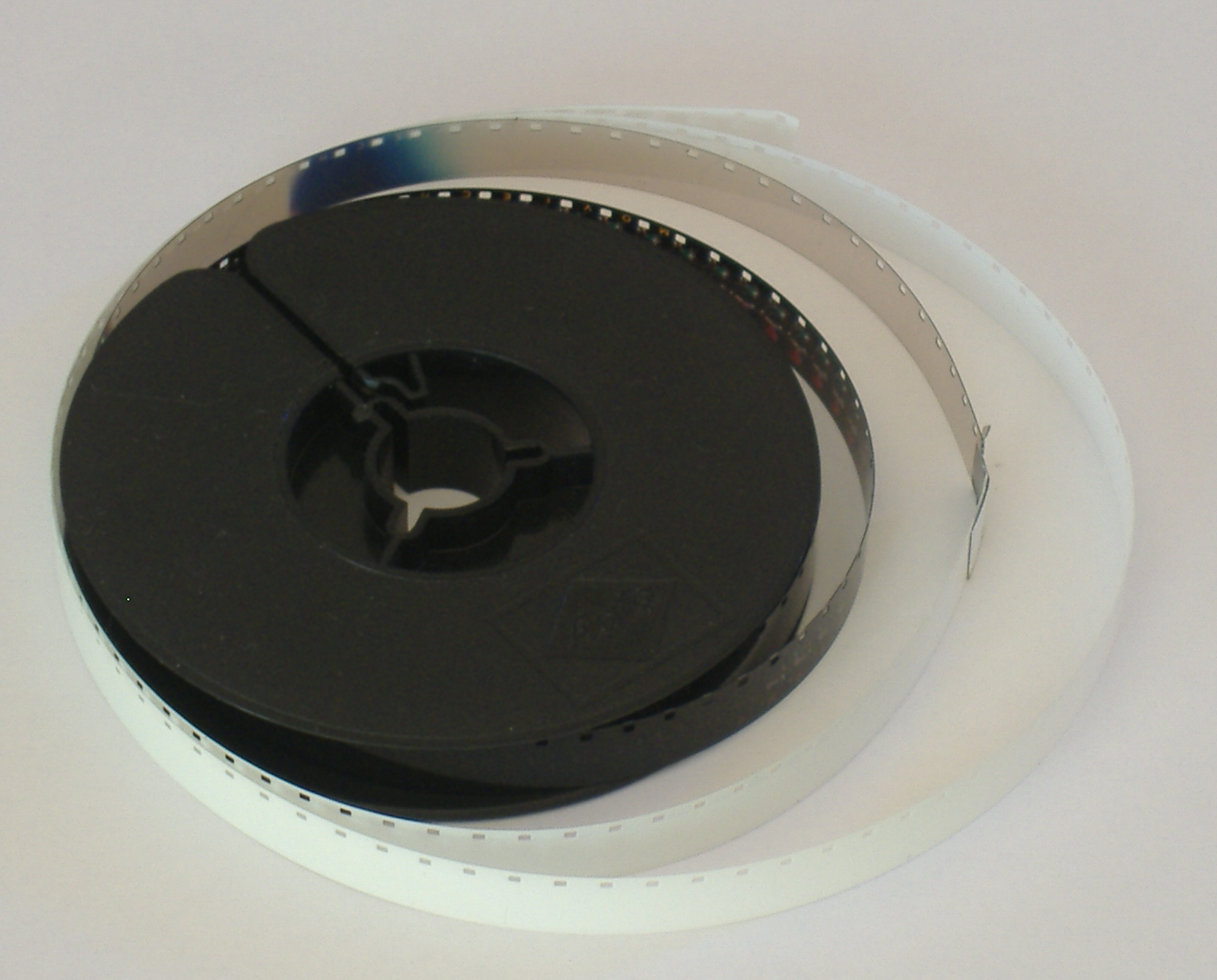
A spool of developed Super 8 Film, with a protective white leader.

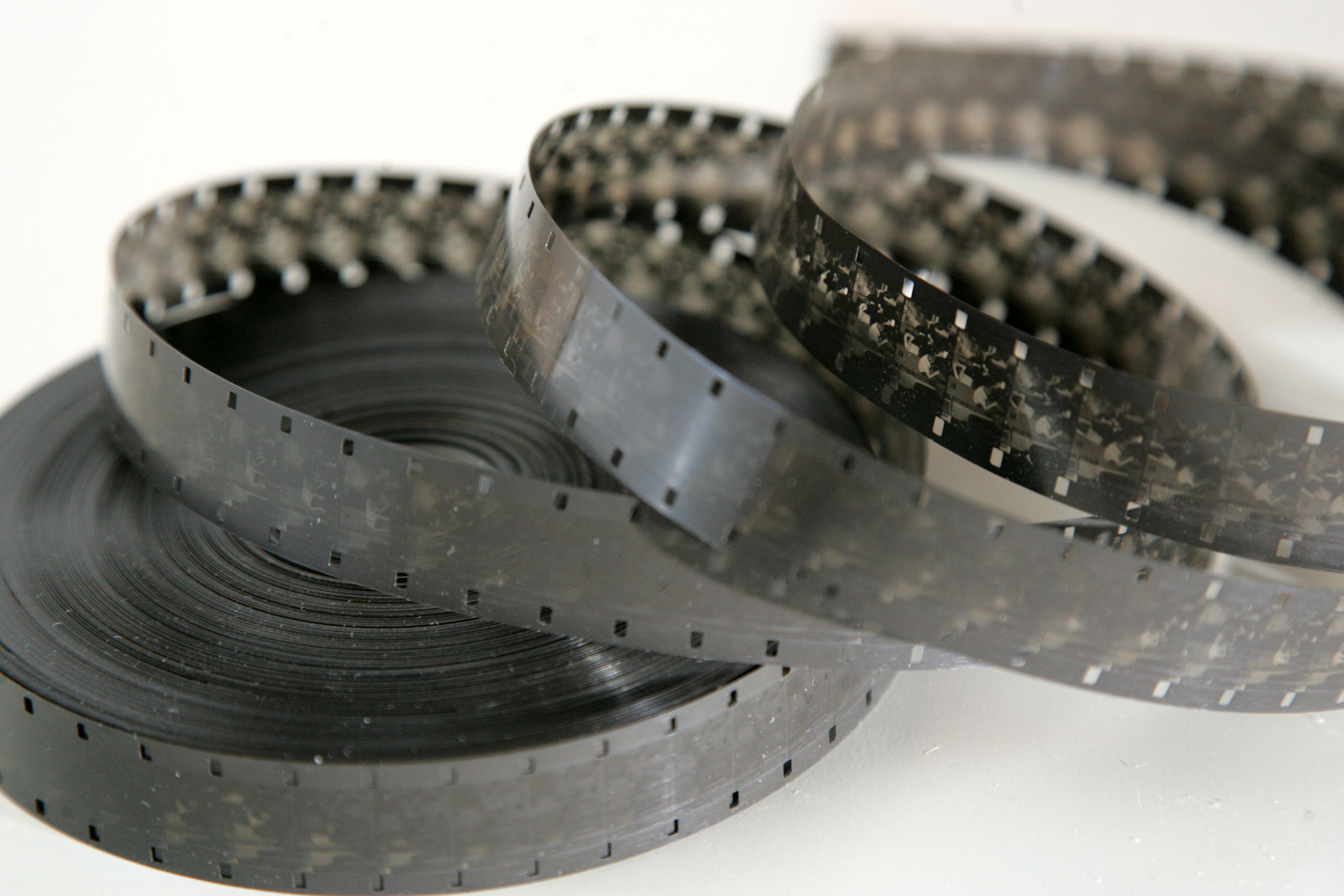
B&W 16mm film, on bobbin core (not a reel)

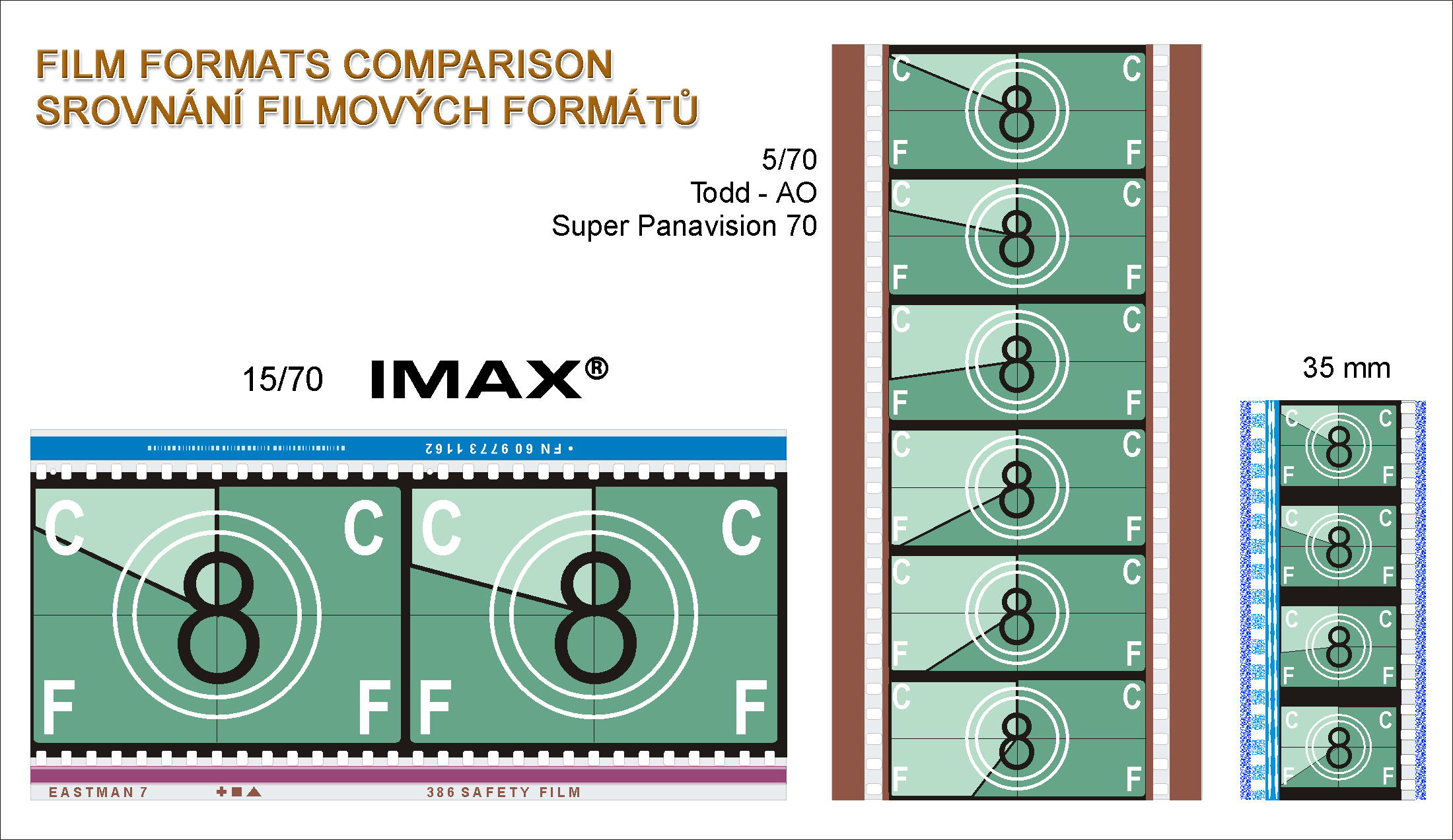
IMAX to 35mm and 35mm film

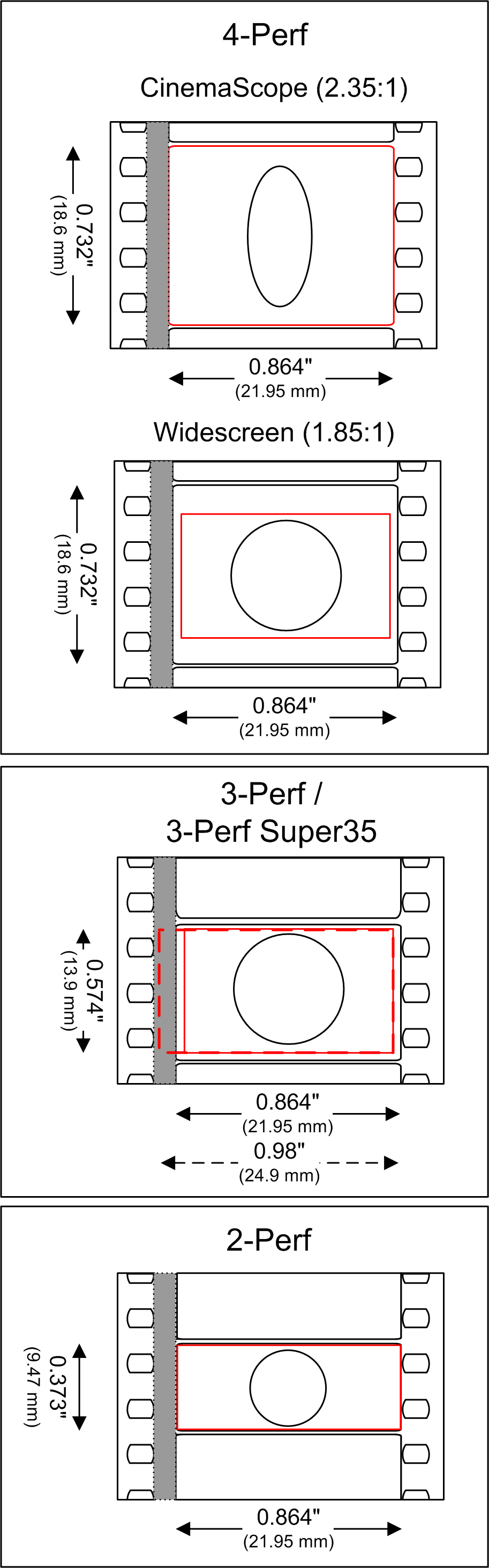
2, 3 and 4 perf film

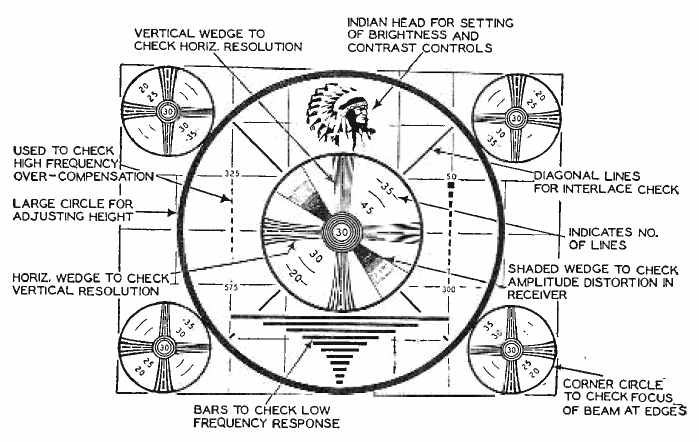
Indian Head pattern with its elements labeled
