= List of BBC test cards =

The following is a list of test cards used by the BBC at various points in broadcasting.

== Tuning Signals ==
First tuning signal

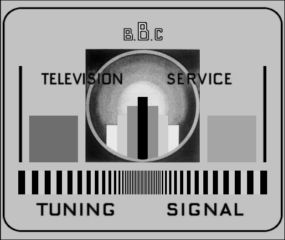
Later tuning signal from 1937

The first "Tuning Signals" test card was broadcast by the BBC in 1934. It was a simple line and circle broadcast using Baird's 30-line system, and was used to synchronise the mechanical scanning system.

== Test Card A ==
Test Card A was introduced in 1936–37. However, it was only broadcast as engineering tests from January to (approx.) October 1947, when it was replaced by the first version of Test Card C. An electronically generated "cruciform" test card (or "art bars") was often shown instead of Test Card A until well into the 1960s.

The test card was designed to test for focus, frequency response and scan geometry. High frequency response is indicated by gratings corresponding to 1, 1.5, 2, 2.5 and 3 MHz; while low frequency response is indicated by a solid black bar below the central circle.

== Test Card B ==
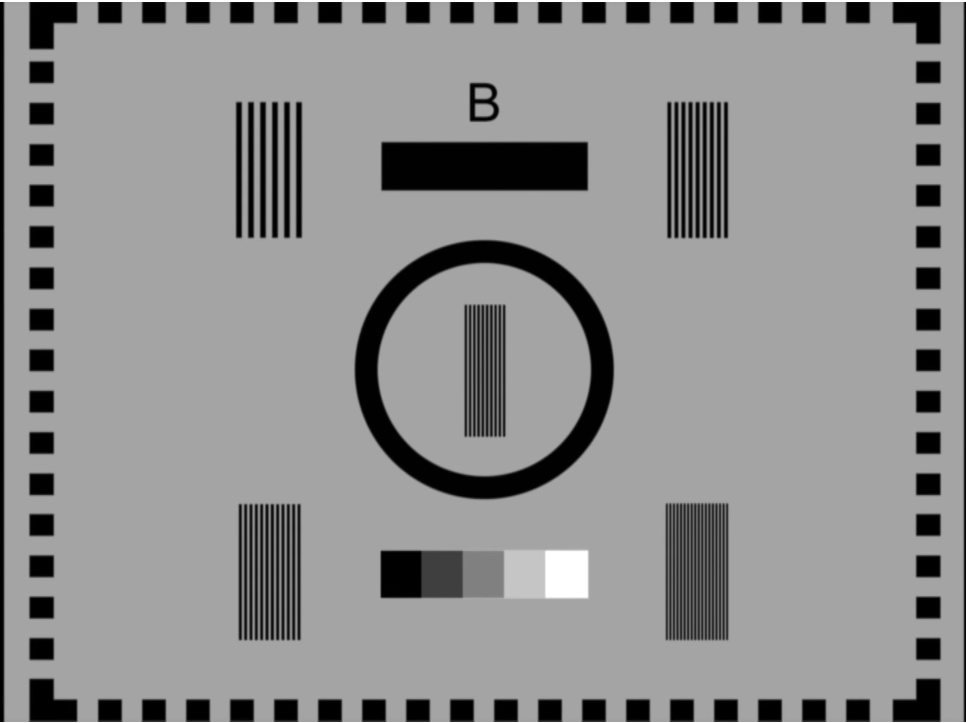
Test Card B (generic reconstruction)

Test Card B was an early BBC television test card. It was very similar to Test Card A and also only broadcast as engineering tests. The original card has since gone missing. The only differences were that the frequency bars were juxtaposed, the values were deleted, and an Ilford Panchromatic Response Chart placed below the circle where the letter box had been, the letter box in Test Card A was moved to the top of the card replacing the vertical resolution test.

== Test Card C ==
Test Card C

Test Card C was a BBC television test card first broadcast in 1947. It was the first test card to resemble the famous Test Card F.

Test Card C allowed adjustment and verification of parameters such as:

- Aspect Ratio: central circles
- Resolution: five gratings corresponding to frequencies of 1.0, 1.5, 2.0, 2.5 and 3.0 MHz
- Contrast: five steps with the top square corresponding to 100% and the bottom square to 30% luminance
- Linearity: white squares
- Low Frequency Response: letterbox above the circle
- Reflections: black and white areas to the sides of the circle
- Focus: diagonal black and white stripes
- Picture into sync: triggered by the castellations

The card was available as individual rolls of test film in the UK and many Commonwealth countries up until the end of the black-and-white television era.

Test Card C continued in use on 405-lines until 1964 being replaced by Test Card D.

625-line variants of Test Card C were later used in Jamaica, Mauritius, Singapore and Trinidad and Tobago. Heavy modifications of Test Card C were used by ABC Television in Australia and NIRT in Iran.

=== Pye Test Card G ===
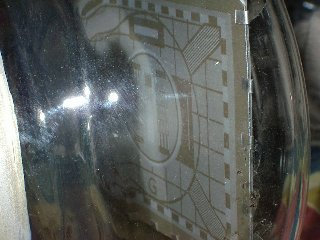
Pye Test Card G as seen on a monoscope.

Pye developed a monochrome variant of Test Card C called Test Card G. It was used in several countries that use 625-line PAL and SECAM, such as People's Republic of Bulgaria, Denmark, Luxembourg, Thailand, Barbados, Malaysia, and Hungarian People's Republic, but not in Britain. A slightly modified version was used by YLE in Finland until it switched to the colour Telefunken FuBK test card in the 1970s, as well as in Norway where NRK and Telenor used it in conjunction with the EIA 1956 resolution chart until it switched to the Philips PM5544, Test Card F and the Telefunken FuBK test cards in the 1970s.

== Test Card D ==
Test Card D

Test Card D was a television test card first broadcast on 5 May 1964 by both the BBC and the ITA. This Test Card was a joint effort between the BBC, BREMA and the ITA.

This was the first test card to be based on a specification. Test Card D was amended, and the amendment introduced on 1 December 1965 as the radio and television trade objected to the original. Both versions had Reduced Power variants from the start.

== Test Card E (later Test Card C) ==
Modified Test Card C

Test Card E was a television test card designed in 1964 and made to accommodate the 625-line system on BBC2, as opposed to the 405-line system of Test Card D. However, Test Card E lasted for only four and a half days before being withdrawn. Test Card E was thereafter replaced by a modified version of Test Card C, which lasted on BBC2 until December 1964, the illustrated version of Test Card C shown here replaced the first version, and was discontinued in September 1969, and when the colour Test Card F was introduced in July 1967, Test Card C was only shown between 9.00 and 9.58 a.m.

A version of the modified Test Card C also aired on BBC1 and BBC 2 from November 1969 (with the BBC1 and BBC 2 logos replacing the "BBC2 625 LINES" caption). This modified Test Card C also had versions where Reduced Power also appeared in the ident box. This version of Test Card C was last used in February 1975, and was only ever generated locally at the transmitter. Test Card E did however see later usage by RTÉ in Ireland and RTP in Portugal alongside Test Card D.

== Test Card F ==
Test Card F was the BBC's longest-running and most famous test card, featuring Carole Hersee and Bubbles the Clown. There have been many different Test Card F variations. It was first broadcast on 2 July 1967 (the day after the first colour pictures appeared to the public on television) on BBC2.

== Test Card G ==
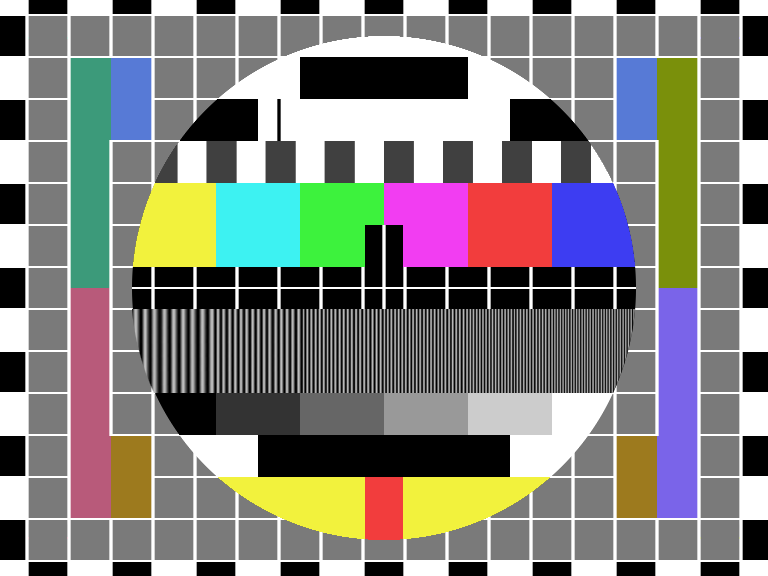
Recreation of Test Card G (PM5544 variation)

Test Card G was a television test card broadcast occasionally by the BBC. It was a variant of the famous Philips PM5544 test card and was introduced around 1971 as their first electronically generated colour test card. Test Card G was generally used by local transmitters for opt outs or during times when a particular region was not showing a programme broadcast from London. It was also used in place of Test Card F nationally from time to time when the projector showing F's photographic slide was not available or undergoing maintenance. This ended some time after Test Card F was converted to electronic form in 1984. Test Card G was also occasionally used by ITV and its regulator the IBA alongside Test Card F and EBU colour bars before switching over to the ETP-1 test card in 1979, though London Weekend Television (LWT) and ITV Channel Television, two constituent franchisee companies in the ITV network structure, continued to broadcast Test Card G after closedown well into the 1980s.

== Test Card H ==
Test Card H

Test Card H was designed as a line up chart for cameras in-studio, possibly to test chroma specifications as well as resolution and bandwidth. The "H" designation was solely used for this chart, and was therefore never allocated to a Test Card used for broadcasting; following this, the letter "I" was also passed over as a Test Card letter, having been considered too similar to the number "1", therefore leading to Test Card J being the next in the series.

== Test Card J ==
Test Card J is an enhanced revision of Test Card F, first broadcast in November 1999.

== Test Card W ==
Test Card W is an updated 16:9 (1.78:1) widescreen version of Test Card F. A predecessor card, without an identifying letter, first appeared in March 1998 as part of digital tests on the Astra 1D satellite, and was notably broadcast to the public on 6 November 1998 as part of a joke on Have I Got News For You to censor then-host Angus Deayton about discussing Peter Mandelson's life. Test Card W first appeared in November 1999 alongside Test Card J, with which it bears some similarities. Both aforementioned test cards were designed for the 16:9 (widescreen) ratio.

== Test Card X ==
The high-definition version of Test Card W is visually similar but officially lacks a designation letter. This version is often referred to as Test Card X, but this is not a designation which the BBC recognises. It is designed for use on high-definition TV services, & had been included a part of BBC HD's preview loop since November 2008 (though it had been in use internally at the BBC for several years prior) until the channel's closure in March 2013.

== Unidentified test card ==
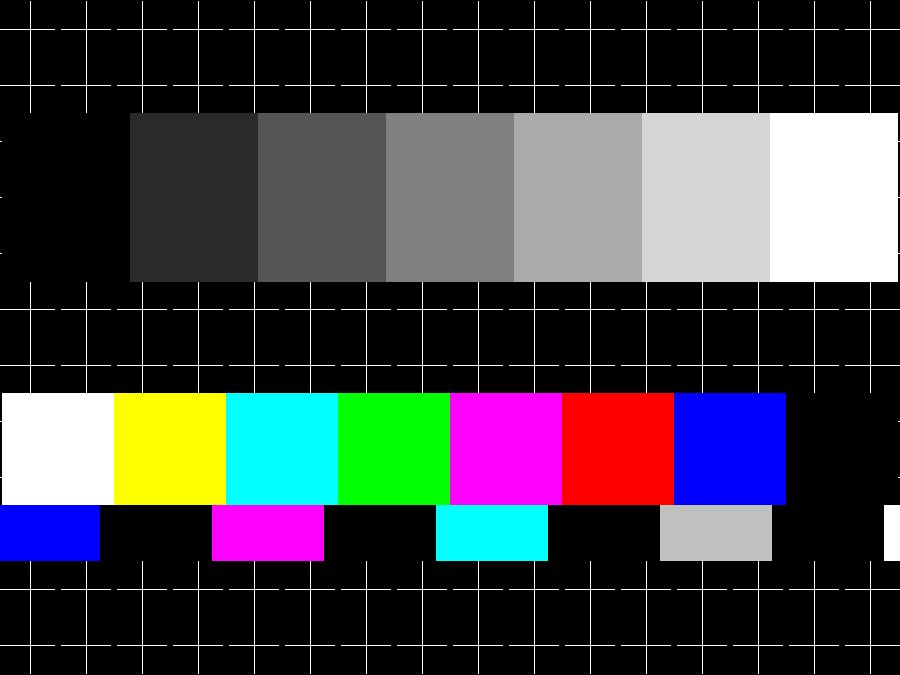
Recreation of the BBC unnamed electronic test card

An electronically generated image was first broadcast on 21 June 1997 on BBC2 between 3 am and 4 am. It was also broadcast in October 1997 from 3:29 am until 3:44 am, when, at the same time, BBC1 showed Test Card G. Both channels reverted over to these at the same time, and reverted to TCF at the same time, as part of a switching test with BBC Birmingham, whereby in the event of a need to evacuate BBC TV to Pebble Mill Studios in Birmingham, such as a power failure as happened in June 2000, a switch would be thrown, putting Birmingham in control of the network, until BBC Television Centre could regain control. Both TCG and this image were transmitted from Birmingham to prove the switching facility worked.

This test card was then seen again on 17 April 2007 between 4 am and 5 am during the BBC Learning Zone. Both transmissions were accompanied by a four-tone test tone, ranging from extremely low frequency to a very high shrill. It is unknown if this Test Card has a name, though this test card has also been known to be used on point-to-point satellite links originating from the Fucino Space Centre and other places in Italy (Telefisco, Lapet, etc), and by Marconi Portugal. Another version, modified for NTSC, was used by Televisión Nacional de Chile (TVN) in the 1990s.

== Untransmitted test cards ==
There have been a number of untransmitted test cards. They would most likely be for internal use inside the BBC. Most of them are adapted from Test Card F.

== Comic Relief test card ==
A Comic Relief test card was broadcast on BBC1 on 18 March 1993 as part of Comic Relief. This test card featured ten-year-old competition winner Hannah Marriott, wearing a red nose.

== See also ==
- Trade test colour films
- PM5544
- ETP-1
- Video-signal generator
