= Multiburst =

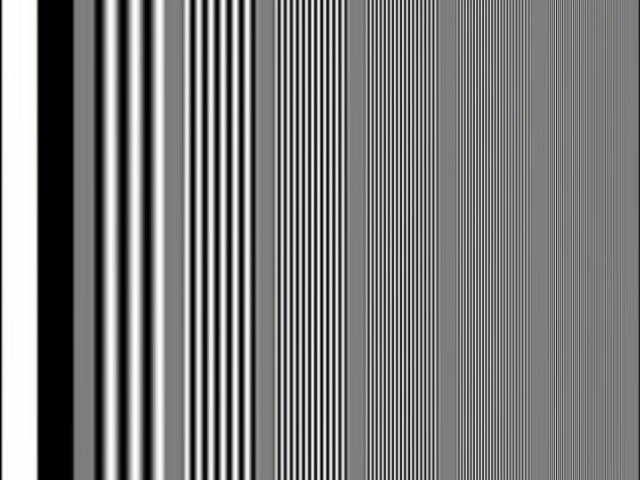
A multiburst test pattern, as displayed on a television screen

A multiburst waveform is a useful test pattern used to quickly ascertain the frequency response of a video system. The name derives from the multiple bursts of sine wave in the active video section of the waveform which are generated with (usually) increasing frequency, but identical in amplitude. The test pattern is usually input at the start of the signal chain and analysed at the end. By measuring the amplitude of each of the 'bursts' of waveform at the end of the video chain, spot measurements of the frequency response of the system can be obtained and errors in the response quickly identified.

== Importance of frequency response ==
In a video system, the frequency response needs to be as flat as possible or distortion in the picture displayed will occur. Analogue video signals contain a frequency content from 25 Hz up to around 5 MHz, and so variations in frequency responses will affect the picture in various ways, depending on whether it is high frequency (>1 MHz) or low frequency (<1 MHz) distortion. Low frequency distortion will cause field-rate impairment, manifesting itself as luminance variation between the top and bottom of a picture. High frequency distortion causes problems with sharpness of the picture: high frequency roll-off causes loss of definition, while high frequency peaking emphasises edges and adds noise to the picture.

Ideally, each of the frequency bursts should produce a group of distinct, black and white vertical bars on the monitor screen. Due to frequency response roll-off in the signal transmission path, the higher frequency vertical bars tend to blur into a uniform grey. From this, it is possible to get a quick visual estimate of the overall frequency response of the system, since the frequency of each of the bursts is known.

== See also ==
- Indian-head test pattern
- Images of test cards
- Index of video-related articles
