= Indian-head test pattern =

Television test card

The RCA Indian-head test pattern

The Indian-head test pattern is a test card that gained widespread adoption during the black-and-white television broadcasting era as an aid in the calibration of television equipment. It features a drawing of a Native American wearing a headdress surrounded by numerous graphic elements designed to test different aspects of broadcast display. The card was created by RCA to be the standard image for their TK-1 monoscope, a simple video camera capable of producing only the image embedded within it. The pattern was introduced in 1939 and over the following two decades became a fixture of television broadcast across North America in 525-line resolution and (often in modified form) abroad in 525- and 625-line resolution until it was made obsolete by the rise of color television in the 1960s.

== Features and use ==
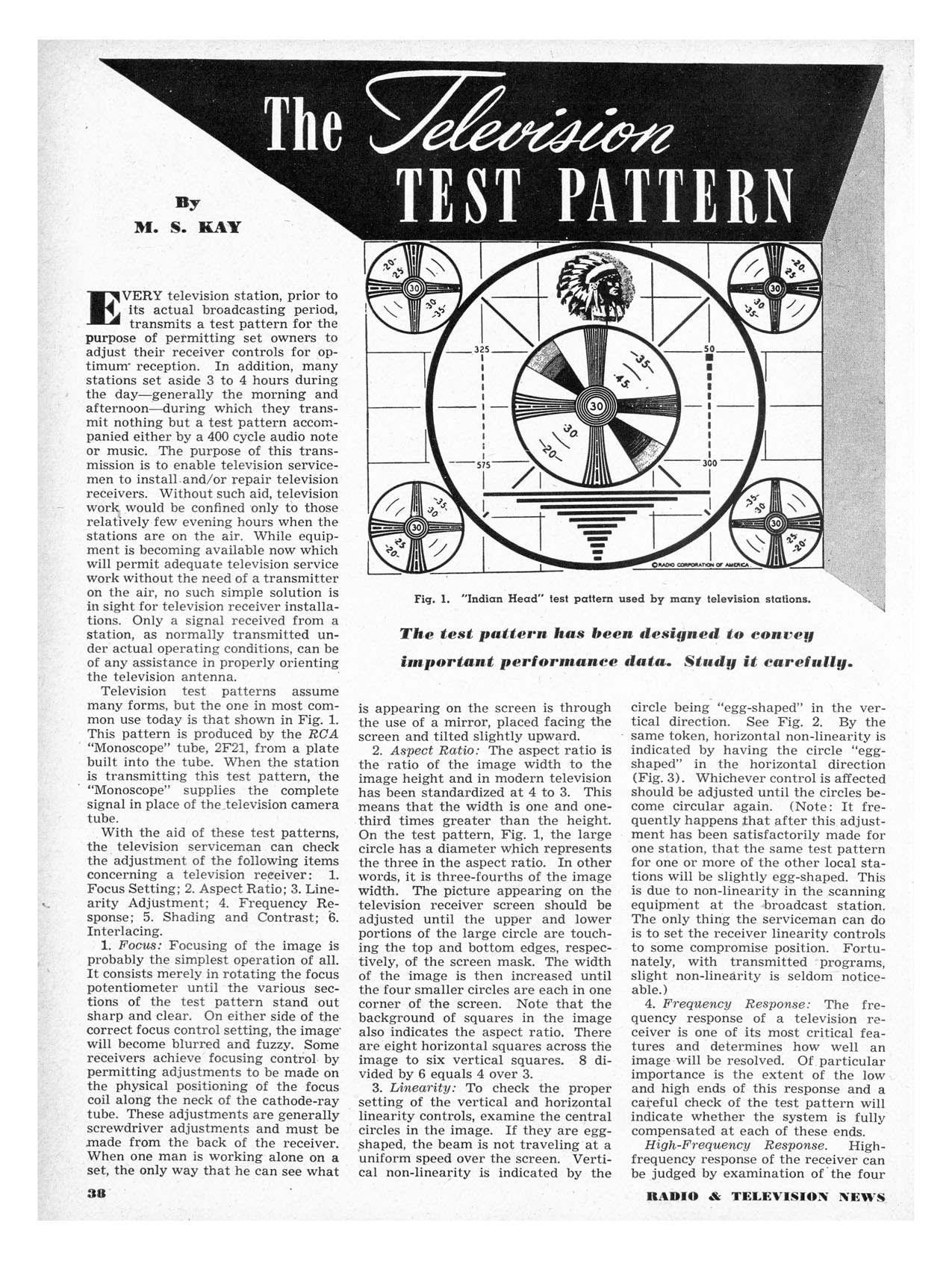
The Indian Head pattern as mentioned in Ziff Davis's Radio & Television News trade magazine in January 1949.

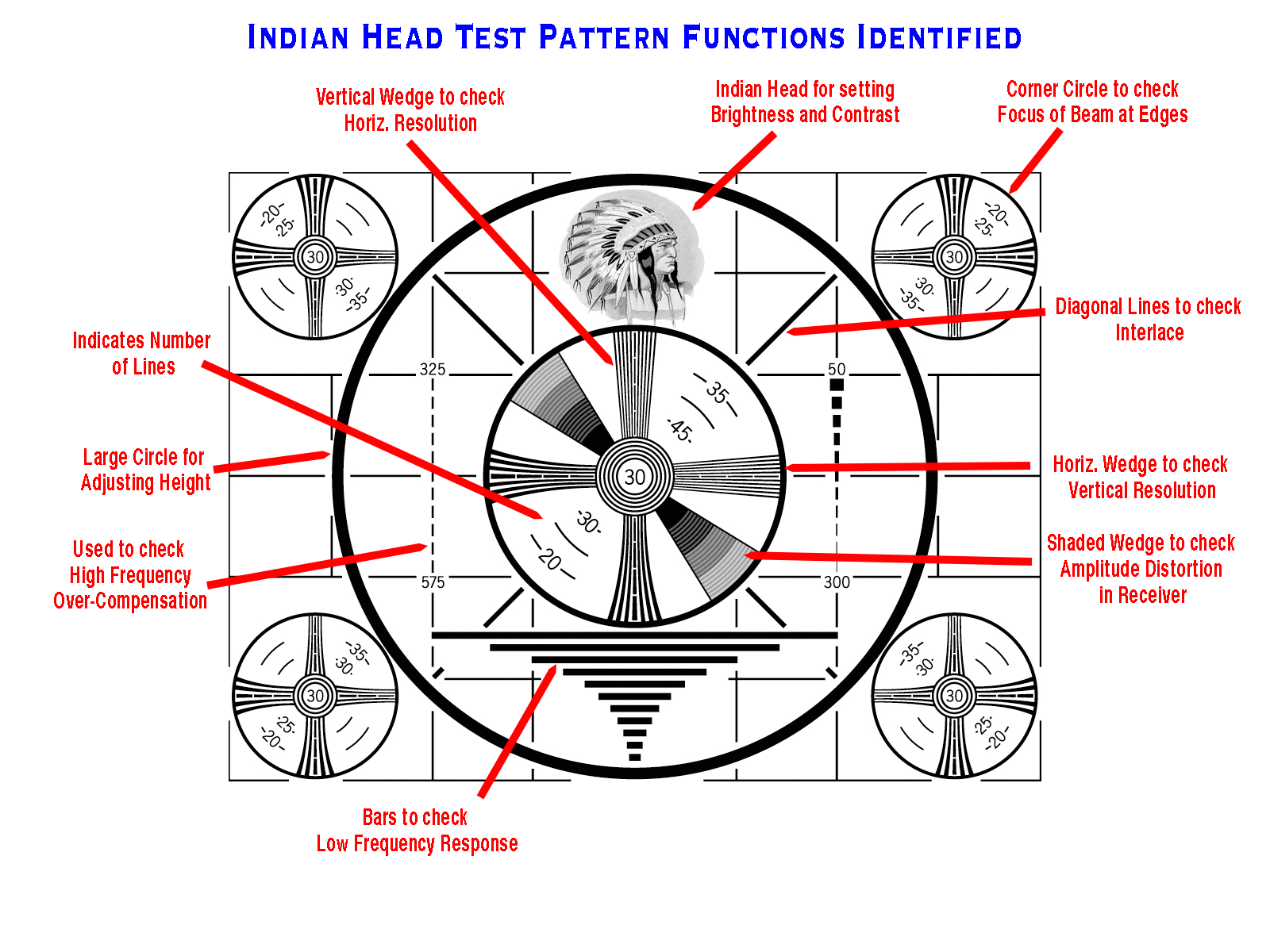
Indian Head pattern with its elements labeled, describing the use of each element in aligning a black and white analog TV receiver.

The Indian-head test pattern was created by RCA at its factory in Harrison, New Jersey. Each element of the card was designed to measure a specific technical aspect of television broadcast so that an experienced engineer could, at a glance, identify problems. The card contains elements used to measure aspect ratio, (Note: Analog television on cathode-ray tubes also needed to be adjusted for vertical and horizontal linearity. An error in vertical linearity (such as the top of the picture stretched with the bottom squashed) might go unnoticed on the SMPTE colour bar pattern, but would instantly turn a circle into an egg-shape.) perspective, framing, linearity, frequency response, differential gain, contrast, and brightness. The grid and circles were used for perspective, framing and linearity. The tapered lines (marked with 20, 25, 30, and 35) were used for resolution and frequency response. The thin lines marked from 575 to 325 on one side and 300 to 50 on the other side referred to lines of resolution. The gray bands emerging from the center off to the lower right and upper left were for differential gain, contrast, and white level.

The pattern began with the Indian-head portrait created in August 1938 by an artist named Brooks using pencil, charcoal, ink and zinc oxide. For about a year, the portrait (which contains several identifiable shades of gray from Zone VIII texture in the white feathers to Zone II texture in the black hair) was the entire test pattern, but in 1939 the portrait was incorporated into the current pattern of calibrated lines and shapes.

The RCA TK-1C monoscope camera that generated the test pattern

Television stations would produce the image of the Indian-head test pattern in two ways. First, they would use a monoscope in which the pattern was permanently embedded, which was capable of producing the image with a high degree of consistency due to the device's simplicity. The monoscope tube is constructed similarly to a small cathode-ray tube (CRT), but instead of displaying an image, it scans a built-in image, producing a video signal. The tube has a perfectly proportioned copy of the test pattern master art (or a modified variant with the station ID replacing the Indian-head portrait, such as those used by KRLD-TV, WBAP-TV and WKY-TV) inside, permanently deposited as a carbon image on an aluminum target plate or slide. The target plate is sequentially scanned with a focused beam of electrons, which were originally called cathode rays. When the electron beam strikes the carbon image areas, the carbon resists current flow, and the resulting lower electron current flow is adjusted to appear as video black. When the electron beam strikes the metallic-aluminum image areas, there is less resistance with higher current flow, and the resulting higher electron current flow is adjusted to appear as video white. This image was used to calibrate monitors in the station. Second, stations would use a cardboard-mounted lithograph of the test pattern (typically attached to a rolling easel in each TV studio); videographing the lithograph would create a second image that could be compared against the monoscope-created control image.

The test pattern was useful for the calibration of home television sets as well as television studio equipment, so the image was routinely broadcast outside hours of programming. (Note: "Every television station, prior to its actual broadcasting period, transmits a test pattern for the purpose of permitting set owners to adjust their receiver controls for optimum reception." The article also states that television programming (in 1949) was only a few hours each evening.) The Indian-head test pattern was built into the RCA "monoscope" tube, a 2F21, which acted as a complete replacement for the TV camera. (It was often accompanied by an audio test tone for the purposes of calibrating aural system frequency response measurements. (Note: 1,000 Hz is the standard 0dB (0 decibel) reference point for analog-NTSC TV aural system frequency response measurements, but for simple line-reference 0dB audio level setting, preference for hearing 400 Hz is common knowledge and experience among broadcast and audio technicians. "From the factory the frequency of the reference tone is configured to be 400 Hz. This is a nice alternative to the more typical 1 kHz, a frequency which can soon become very annoying to a listener's ears. In most cases 400 Hz will be perfectly acceptable, and actually preferred."))

== As a cultural icon ==
From the late 1950s, the test pattern gradually began to be seen less frequently, after fewer sign-offs, on fewer stations, and for shorter periods in the morning, since new and improved TV broadcast equipment required less adjusting. In later years, the test pattern was transmitted for as little as a minute after sign-off while the transmitter engineer logged required Federal Communications Commission-US/Board of Broadcast Governors transmitter readings before cutting power.

By the mid-1960s, the Indian-head test pattern became obsolete after most television broadcasts switched to color. From that point onward, an alternate test card of SMPTE color bars (and its immediate predecessors), or colorized versions of the NBC/CBS-derived "bullseye" patterns became the test card of choice. Since the 1990s, most television stations in the United States have broadcast continuously without regular sign-offs, instead running infomercials, networked overnight news shows, syndicated reruns, cartoons, or old movies; thus, the broadcast of test patterns has become mostly obsolete (though they are still used in post-production and broadcast facilities to check color and signal paths).

Nevertheless, the Indian-head test pattern persists as a symbol of early television. Many U.S. television stations chose the image of the Indian-head card to be their final image broadcast when their analog signals signed off for the final time between February 17 and June 12, 2009, as part of the digital television transition in the United States.

The 1998 film Pleasantville features the Indian-head test pattern when twin siblings wind up trapped in a 1950s television show.

In 2008, Bethesda Softworks released Fallout 3, which included the Indian-head test pattern in its “Please stand by” loading screen. This image was included in subsequent Fallout games.

A variant of the card appeared on the Canadian sketch comedy show Second City Television in the late-1970s, and another variant appeared on theatrical release posters for "Weird Al" Yankovic's 1989 film UHF. Some Pioneer GGV1069 LaserDisc reference discs released for the NTSC market included a variant of the card, but modified with a gray-colored grid and a drawing of a Japanese lion-dog replacing the Indian-head portrait. The pattern was used on Archie McPhee night lights sold from 1997 to 2005. (Note: The Indian-head test pattern night light was included in a set of three novelty night lights with test pattern lamp shades: RCA TK-1 Indian head (1950s), SMPTE color bars (1960s), and an Emergency Broadcast System (EBS) TV-test slide image ("This is a test! This is only a test!") from the middle Cold War era. These patterns were reminiscent of the times when a fairly common late-night experience was to fall asleep while watching the late movie, only to awaken to the characteristic sine wave tone accompanying the Indian-head test pattern on a black-and-white TV screen. According to the customer service department of Archie McPhee company, Seattle, Washington, the set of three, as Item #10480, was sold from 1999-01-11 to 2005-06-17. Their representative said these lamp shades were created by the company, and not obtained from an outside source. (Source accessed by phone on 2007-11-07).) The test card also featured in the opening sequence of the early 1960s science fiction anthology The Outer Limits.

=== Artifacts ===
Nearly all of the hard-to-open, steel-shielded monoscope tubes were junked with their Indian-head test pattern target plates still inside, but many of the board-mounted lithographs survive.

The master art for both the portrait and the pattern design was discovered in a dumpster by a wrecking crew worker as the old RCA factory in Harrison, New Jersey was being demolished in 1970. The worker kept the art for over 30 years before selling it to a collector.

== International variants ==
The Indian head was also used by the Canadian Broadcasting Corporation (CBC) in Canada in conjunction with its own monochrome test pattern, following the Canadian national anthem sign-off in the evening, and during its final years in the late-1970s and early-1980s it was shown before sign-on in the morning, after the showing of the SMPTE color bars.

In Thailand it was used by Thai TV Channel 4 when Thailand used the 525-line system.

It was also used by Rhodesia Television (RTV) during British colonial times (varying between Northern and Southern Rhodesia) following the playing of "God Save the Queen" at closedown.

This test pattern was later used by the Venezuelan TV channel Venevisión, in conjunction with the RMA Resolution Chart 1946, until the late-1970s before signing on with the Venezuelan national anthem. Telesistema Mexicano (now Televisa) stations also used this test pattern until the late-1960s immediately after playing the Mexican national anthem at sign-off.

In the Dominican Republic, the Indian-head pattern was used by its public broadcaster Corporación Estatal de Radio y Televisión (CERTV) in the late-1960s and 1970s (in conjunction with the EIA 1956 resolution chart test card) after playing the National Anthem of the Dominican Republic at sign-off.

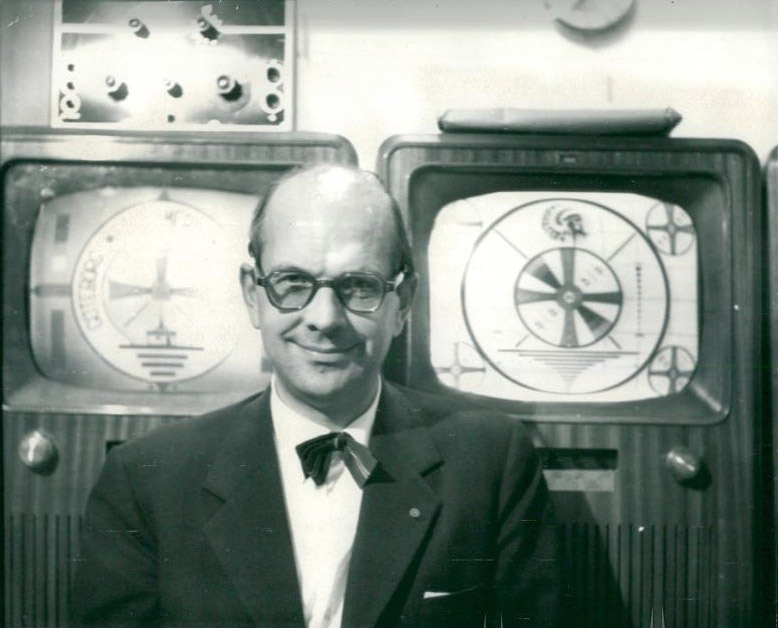
Swedish botanist and radio and TV personality Nils Dahlbeck posing in front of the Indian-head test pattern and the Chalmers University of Technology experimental TV station test card in 1957

In Sweden, the Indian-head test pattern was used in test transmissions from the KTH Royal Institute of Technology in Stockholm alongside the RMA Resolution Chart 1946, Telefunken T05 test card, as well as other experimental test cards from Televerket and Chalmers University of Technology from 1948 until November 1958 when it was replaced by the Sveriges Radio TV (now Sveriges Television) test card.

In Australia, the Indian-head test pattern was used by TNT-9 in Northern Tasmania in conjunction with the Marconi Resolution Chart No. 1 from its launch in 1962 until it adopted colour television in the mid-1970s. This version eschewed the Indian head drawing with the TNT-9 station ID on top, similar to the aforementioned KRLD-TV, WBAP-TV and WKY-TV variants.

Saudi Broadcasting Authority in Saudi Arabia also formerly used a modified version of the Indian-head test pattern, with the Emblem of Saudi Arabia replacing the Indian head drawing, from 1954 until 1982 when it was replaced with a heavily modified Philips PM5544 test card.

The Indian head was also used in Brazil by Rede Tupi, both as a test pattern and as part of a television ident, from its launch in 1950 until it became the first Brazilian television network to adopt colour television in 1971–72.

The Indian head pattern was also used by Kuwait Television in Kuwait from its launch of television services in 1961 until it adopted colour television in the mid-1970s.

In Italy, the pattern was adapted and modified by RAI for its monochrome test cards, used from 1961 to 1977. There were two versions during most of its existence, one with a large N for Programma Nazionale and another with a large 2 for Secondo Programma. By 1976, the N was replaced by a 1 and was made smaller (the same happened to the second network's 2).
