= Monoscope =

Video camera tube displaying a built-in fixed image, 1950s–1980s

The Indian Head test pattern was generated by a monoscope.

A monoscope was a special form of video camera tube which displayed a single still video image. The image was built into the tube, hence the name. The tube resembled a small cathode-ray tube (CRT). Monoscopes were used beginning in the 1950s to generate TV test patterns and station logos. This type of test card generation system was technologically obsolete by the 1980s.

== Design ==
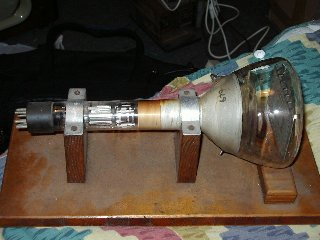
A monoscope

The monoscope was similar in construction to a CRT, with an electron gun at one end and at the other, a metal target screen with an image formed on it. This was in the position where a CRT would have its phosphor-coated display screen. As the electron beam scanned the target, varying numbers of electrons were reflected from the different areas of the image. The reflected electrons were picked up by an internal electrode ring, producing a varying electrical signal which was amplified to become the video output of the tube.

This signal reproduced an accurate still image of the target, so the monoscope was used to produce still images such as test patterns and station logo cards. For example, the classic Indian Head test card as used by many television stations in North America, was often produced using a monoscope.

== Usage ==
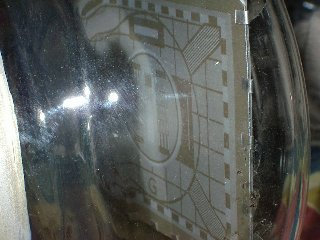
The target is Pye Test Card G in this example

Monoscopes were available with a wide variety of standard patterns and messages, and could be ordered with a custom image such as a station logo. Monoscope "cameras" were widely used to produce test cards, station logos, special signals for test purposes and standard announcements like "Please stand by" and "normal service will be resumed....". They had many advantages over using a live camera pointed at a card; an expensive camera was not tied up, they were always ready, and were never misframed or out of focus. Indeed, monoscopes were often used to calibrate the live cameras, by comparing the monoscope image and the live camera image of the same test pattern.

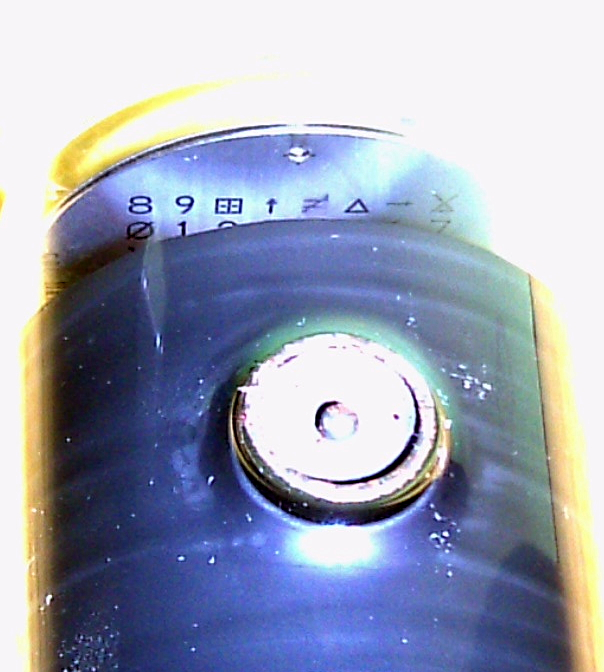
Part of a character generator target with numbers and symbols

Pointing an electronic camera at the same stationary monochrome caption for a long period of time could result in the image becoming burnt onto the camera tube's target — and even onto the phosphor of a monitor displaying it in extreme cases.

Monoscopes were used as character generators for text mode video rendering in computer displays for a short time in the 1960s. The monoscope declined in popularity after the 1960s due to its inability to generate a colour test card, and the development of solid state TV test pattern signal generators.

== See also ==
- Test card, the updated, coloured version of monoscopes.
