= Call signs in the United Kingdom =

Call signs in United Kingdom include a three letter country code, and a series of letters and numbers.

Call signs are regulated internationally by the ITU as well as nationally in the UK by the Office of Communications (Ofcom). It regulates amateur radio in the country as an independent regulator and competition authority for the UK communications industries, with responsibilities across television, radio, telecommunications and wireless communications services. It assigns call signs, issues amateur radio licences, allots frequency spectrum, and monitors the radio waves. Ofcom is no longer responsible for setting and conducting amateur radio exams, which are now run by the Radio Society of Great Britain on their behalf.

The Radio Society of Great Britain (RSGB) is the United Kingdom's recognised national society for amateur radio operators. The society's former patron was Prince Philip, Duke of Edinburgh, and it represents the interests of the UK's licensed radio amateurs.

== Call sign blocks for telecommunication ==
The International Telecommunication Union has assigned the United Kingdom the following call sign blocks for all radio communication, broadcasting or transmission:

Call sign block	Principal use
GAA–GZZ	domestic
MAA–MZZ	domestic
VPA–VQZ	Oceanic islands, Antarctica
VSA–VSZ	
ZBA–ZJZ	Gibraltar, Middle East, south Atlantic
ZNA–ZOZ	
ZQA–ZQZ	
2AA–2ZZ	domestic

While not directly related to call signs, the International Telecommunication Union (ITU) further has divided all countries assigned amateur radio prefixes into three regions; the United Kingdom is located in ITU Region 1.

=== Assignments ===
These are callsigns of BBC Regional transmitters in the years prior to World War II.

Country prefix	Call sign	Location
GBR	G5XX 2	Droitwich
GBR	G5SC	Westerglen
GBR	G5NO	Newcastle upon Tyne
GBR	G2EH	Edinburgh
GBR	G5PY	Plymouth
GBR	G5SX	Swansea
GBR	G5GB	Droitwich
GBR	G2BD	Redmoss
GBR	G5NO	Stagshaw
GBR	G2BE	Lisnagarvey
GBR	G2LO 1	London
GBR	G2LS	Leeds
GBR	G5PY	Plymouth
GBR	G5WA 3	Washford
GBR	G2LO 1	Brookmans Park
GBR	G6BM	Clevedon
GBR	G2ZY	Moorside Edge
GBR	G6FL	Sheffield
GBR	G6BM	Bournemouth
GBR	G2DE	Dundee
GBR	G5SC	Glasgow
GBR	G6KH	Kingston upon Hull
GBR	G6ST	Stoke on Trent
GBR	G5NG	Nottingham
GBR	G5IT	Birmingham
GBR	G6LV	Liverpool

== Call sign assignments for amateur radio ==
Amateur radio or ham radio call signs are unique identifiers for the 75,000 licensed operators. Ofcom allots the individual call signs to the amateurs it licences. Call signs are the property of Ofcom even when assigned.

Prefixes + letters in suffix	Licence class
M3 + 3 Letters	Foundation Licence
M6 + 3 Letters	Foundation Licence
M7 + 3 Letters	Foundation Licence
2E0 + 2 or 3 Letters	Intermediate Licence
2E1 + 2 or 3 Letters	Intermediate Licence
G1 + 3 letters	Full Licence
G2 + 2 or 3 letters	Full Licence
G3 + 2 or 3 letters	Full Licence
G4 + 2 or 3 letters	Full Licence
G5 + 2 or 3 letters	Full Licence
G6 + 2 or 3 letters	Full Licence
G7 + 2 or 3 letters	Full Licence
G8 + 2 or 3 letters	Full Licence
G0 + 3 letters	Full Licence
M0 + 3 letters	Full Licence
M1 + 3 letters	Full Licence
M5 + 2 or 3 letters	Full Licence
M8 + 3 letters	Intermediate from Sept 2025
M9 + 3 letters	Intermediate from Sept 2025
G + 1 number + 1 letter	Contest callsign
M + 1 number + 1 letter	Contest callsign

A 'G' or 'M' callsign can be used without a Regional Secondary Locator (RSL) throughout the United Kingdom and Crown Dependencies. Optionally licensees may choose to add an RSL as the 2nd character of the callsign to indicate which region they are operating from according to the following table:. For callsigns starting with '2' the use of an RSL is mandatory.

Region	Regional Secondary Locator	G-prefix optional RSL	M-prefix optional RSL	2-prefix Mandatory RSL	Club licence G-prefix optional RSL	Club licence M-prefix optional RSL	Special event
England	E, X	GE	ME	2E	GX	MX	GB
Guernsey	U, P	GU	MU	2U	GP	MP	GB
Isle of Man	D, T	GD	MD	2D	GT	MT	GB
Jersey	J, H	GJ	MJ	2J	GH	MH	GB
Northern Ireland	I, N	GI	MI	2I	GN	MN	GB
Scotland	M, S	GM	MM	2M	GS	MS	GB
Wales	W, C	GW	MW	2W	GC	MC	GB

=== Overseas call sign assignments ===
Prefix	DXCC Entity
VP2E	Anguilla
VP2M	Montserrat
VP2V	British Virgin Islands
VP5	Turks & Caicos
VP6	Pitcairn Island
VR6	Pitcairn Island (prior to 1 May 1998)
VP6D	Ducie Island (Pitcairn group)
VP8/F	Falkland Islands
VP8/G	South Georgia Island
VP8/O	South Orkney Islands
VP8/SA	South Sandwich Island
VP8/SH	South Shetland Islands
VP8	Antarctica
VP9	Bermuda
VQ9	Chagos (Indian Ocean)
ZB, ZG	Gibraltar
ZC4	UK Sovereign Base Areas on Cyprus
ZD7	St Helena
ZD8	Ascension Island
ZD9	Tristan Da Cunha
ZF	Cayman Islands

=== Special event call signs ===
Ofcom reserves the right to issue temporary special event call signs to licensed amateurs holding a full licence.

Special event call signs are issued with a 'GB' prefix, but others like GQ, GO, GR, MQ, GA, MO, and 2O have been issued in special cases. Ofcom also allows numerals in special event call sign suffixes. For instance GB75RD was a special event sign for the 75th anniversary of the Reading and District Amateur radio club. More recently Ofcom have agreed to what was a very special arrangement for the use of the Special Event Station call sign Gx100RSGB during 2013 to mark the 100th anniversary of the RSGB (where "x" is replaced by the secondary location identifier, M, W, I, D, U, and J, etc. (but never with B) to form the typical 'GB' prefix for other special events.)

Exceptionally, call signs taking the form 'GB3xx' are usually allocated to repeaters whilst beacons usually take the 'GB3xxx' form.

The GR prefix has now been allocated, as of 2017, as a special event prefix alongside "GB", as the callsign GR2HQ has been in use under a Notice of Variation (NoV) since 2011. The prefix GR has now been allocated in the special event callsign range rather than an NoV. For reference, GR2HQ is the UK multiplier station in the Headquarters section (country-on-country national societies head-to-head section) of the annual IARU HF Championship Contest.

To celebrate the wedding of HRH Prince Harry and Miss Meghan Markle, the RSGB agreed with Ofcom an NoV to authorise the temporary use of the Regional Secondary Locator 'R' after the call sign prefix. Successful applicants were able to use the RSL between 19 and 21 May 2018.

=== Reciprocal agreements ===
Holders of licences in countries signed up to CEPT TR 61-01 must operate with their home call sign prefixed with an M/, they may optionally use an RSL (e.g. ME/, MI/, MM/ etc.). Holders of licences in countries signed up to CEPT T/R 61-01 can operate for 3 months before needing a licence issued by Ofcom.

== See also ==
- Radio Society of Great Britain
- ITU prefix – amateur and experimental stations
- Amateur radio license
