= Test card =

Test signal in television broadcasting

SMPTE color bars: common NTSC test pattern

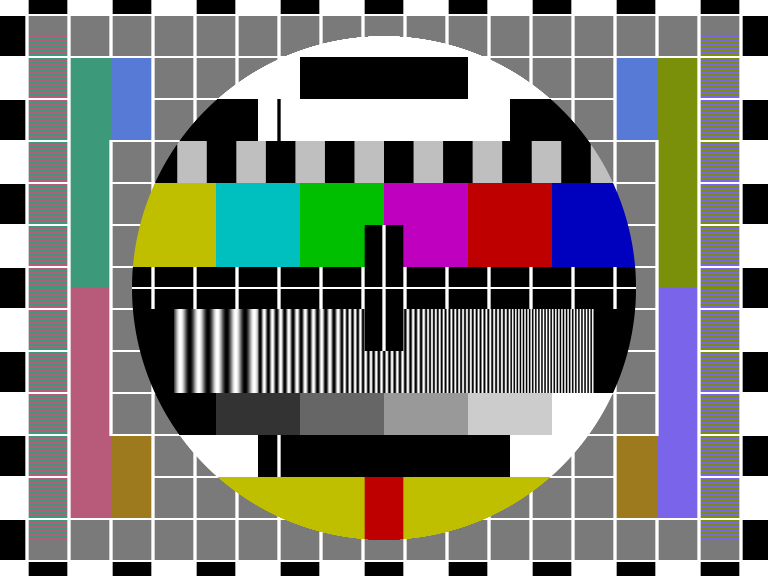
PM5544: common PAL test pattern

A test card, also known as a test pattern or start-up/closedown test, is a television test signal, typically broadcast at times when the transmitter is active but no program is being broadcast (often at sign-on and sign-off), and may be accompanied by a bleep sound.

Used since the earliest TV broadcasts, test cards were originally physical cards at which a television camera was pointed, allowing for simple adjustments of picture quality. Such cards are still often used for calibration, alignment, and matching of cameras and camcorders. From the 1950s, test card images were built into monoscope tubes which freed up the use of TV cameras which would otherwise have to be rotated to continuously broadcast physical test cards during downtime hours.

Electronically generated test patterns, used for calibrating or troubleshooting the downstream signal path, were introduced in the late-1960s, and became commonly used from the 1970s and 80s. These are generated by test signal generators, which do not depend on the correct configuration (and presence) of a camera, and can also test for additional parameters such as correct color decoding, sync, frames per second, and frequency response. These patterns are specially tailored to be used in conjunction with devices such as a vectorscope, allowing precise adjustments of image equipment.

The audio broadcast while test cards are shown is typically a sine wave tone, radio (if associated or affiliated with the television channel) or music (usually instrumental, though some also broadcast with jazz or popular music).

Digitally generated cards came later, associated with digital television, and add a few features specific of digital signals, like checking for error correction, chroma subsampling, aspect ratio signaling, surround sound, etc. More recently, the use of test cards has also expanded beyond television to other digital displays such as large LED walls and video projectors.

== Technical details ==
EBU colour bars (4:3).

Test cards typically contain a set of patterns to enable television cameras and receivers to be adjusted to show the picture correctly (see SMPTE color bars). Most modern test cards include a set of calibrated color bars which will produce a characteristic pattern of "dot landings" on a vectorscope, allowing chroma and tint to be precisely adjusted between generations of videotape or network feeds. SMPTE bars—and several other test cards—include analog black (a flat waveform at 7.5 IRE, or the NTSC setup level), full white (100 IRE), and a "sub-black", or "blacker-than-black" (at 0 IRE), which represents the lowest low-frequency transmission voltage permissible in NTSC broadcasts (though the negative excursions of the color burst signal may go below 0 IRE). Between the color bars and proper adjustment of brightness and contrast controls to the limits of perception of the first sub-black bar, an analog receiver (or other equipment such as VTRs) can be adjusted to provide impressive fidelity.

Test cards have also been used to determine actual coverage contours for new television broadcasting antennas and/or networks. In preparation for the new commercial ITV service in the 1950s, the Independent Television Authority (ITA) tasked Belling & Lee, an Enfield-based British electronics company best known for inventing the Belling-Lee connector just over three decades earlier, with designing a series of Pilot Test Transmission test cards and slides intended for potential viewers and DX-enthusiasts to test the ITA's new Band III VHF transmitter network that was designed with the assistance of the General Post Office (GPO), then the UK's government-run PTT agency. These test cards, some featuring the G9AED call sign assigned by the GPO for said transmissions, featured a squiggly line in a circle in the middle of the test card with an on-screen line gauge indicated in miles which was used as a guide to reveal the distance between the receiver, the (temporary) transmitter and a replicating landscape feature causing ghosting. Said test cards were mainly transmitted from temporary mobile transmitters attached to caravan trailers based at the predicted locations of the ITA's eventual main transmitters, such as Croydon, Lichfield, Emley Moor and Winter Hill. Almost a decade later, the BBC started using a modified SMPTE monochrome test card radiating from the Crystal Palace transmitter to test its new UHF network which it eventually launched as BBC Two in 1964.

Test cards are also used in the broader context of video displays for concerts and live events. There are a variety of different test patterns, each testing a specific technical parameter: gradient monotone bars for testing brightness and color; a crosshatch pattern for aspect ratio, alignment, focus, and convergence; and a single-pixel border for over-scanning and dimensions.

== History ==
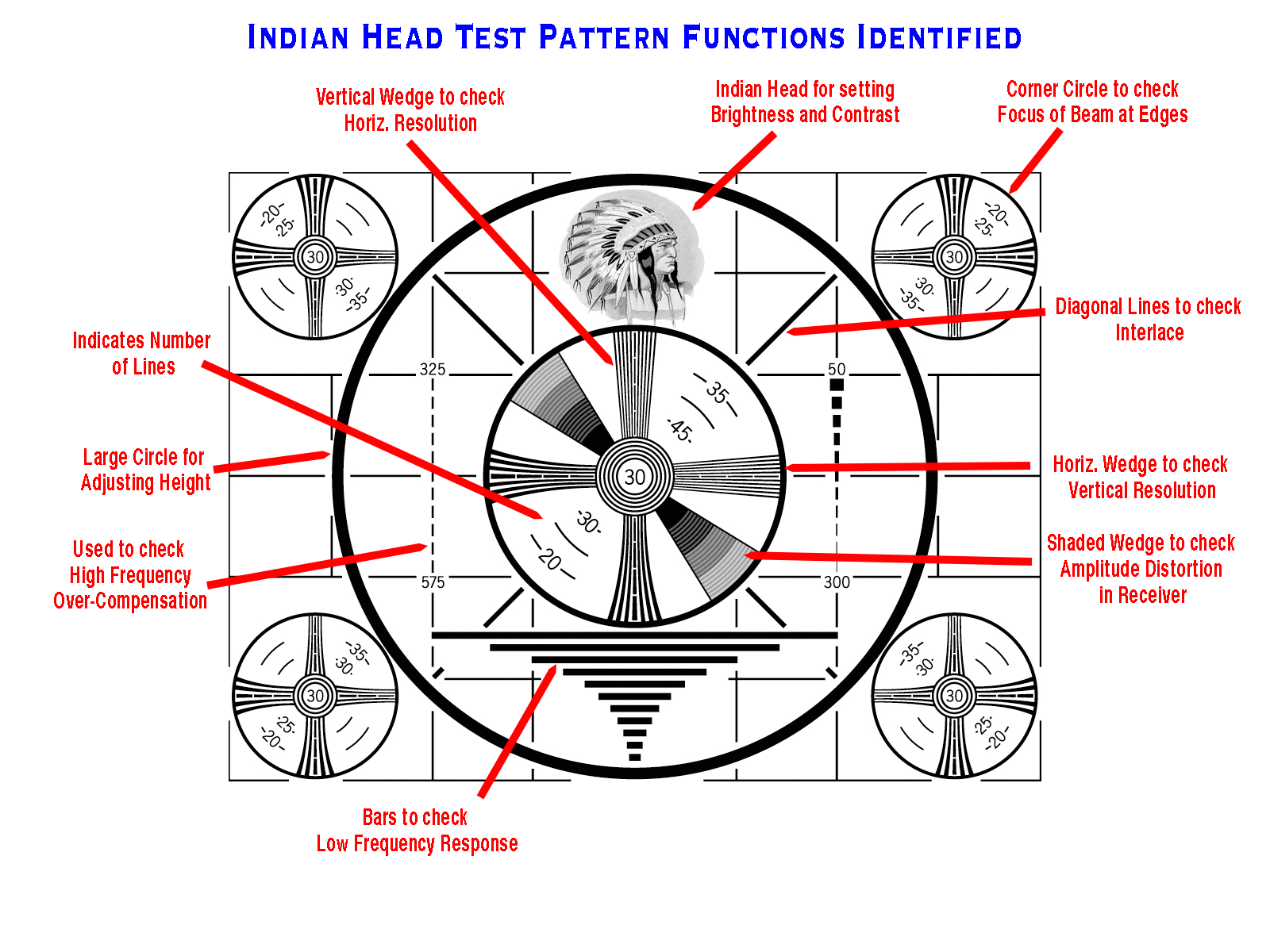
The famous RCA Indian-head test pattern used mainly in North America from 1940 to the 1970s with its elements labelled, describing the use of each element in aligning a black & white analog TV receiver.

First RTF test card (1953) for the French 819-line TV system. Also used in French Algeria, with modifications also used by TMC in Monaco, Telesaar in the Saar Protectorate, and TVN in Chile

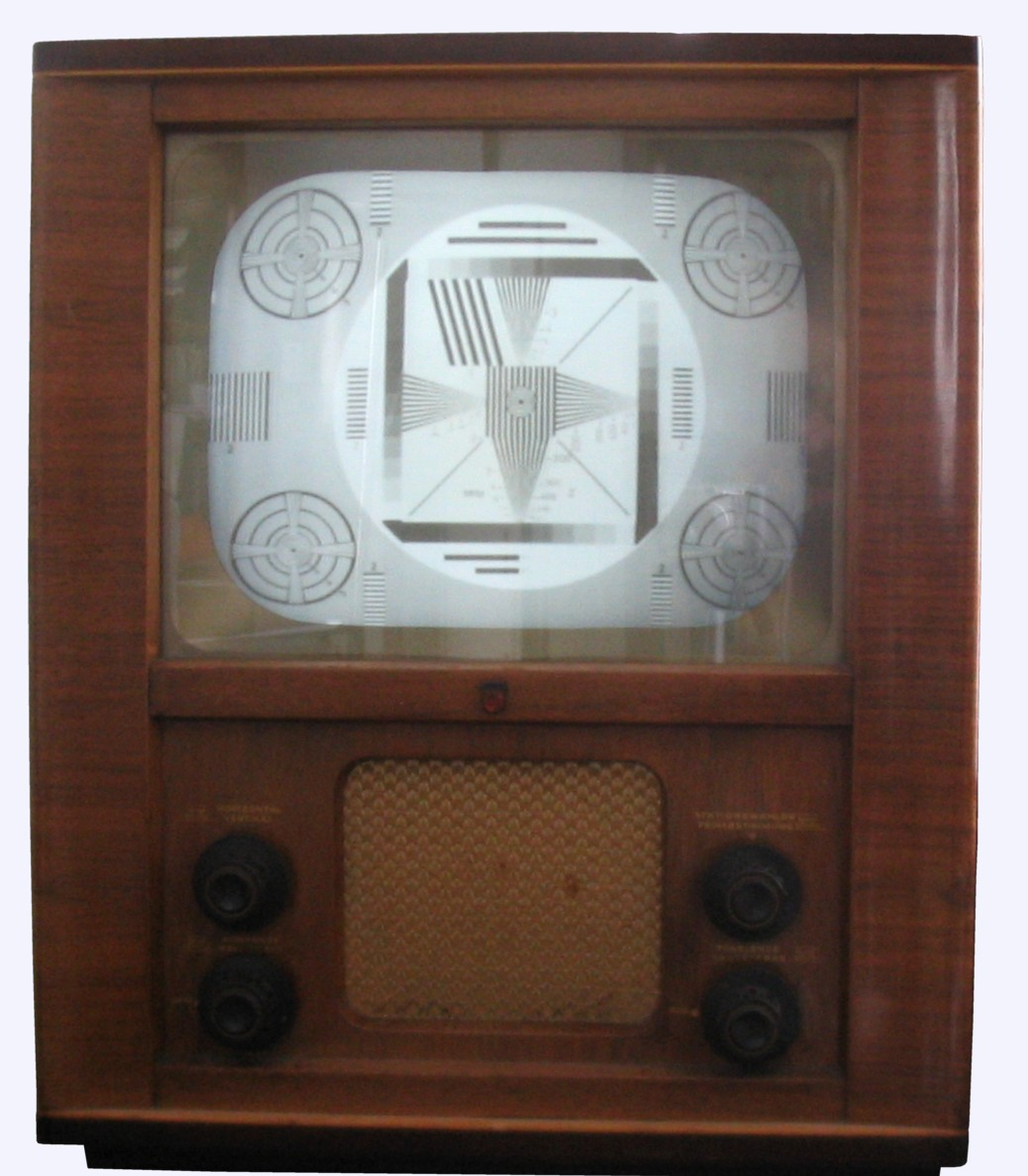
A 1952 Philips TD1410U television set showing the optical monochrome Telefunken T05 test card.

Test cards are as old as TV broadcasts, with documented use by the BBC in the United Kingdom in its early 30-line mechanical Baird transmissions from 1934 and later on as simplified "tuning signals" shown before startup as well as in Occupied France during World War II. They evolved to include gratings for resolution testing, grids to assist with picture geometry adjustments, and grayscale for brightness and contrast adjustments. For example, all these elements can be seen in a Radiodiffusion-Télévision Française 819-line test card introduced in 1953.

In North America, most test cards such as the famous Indian-head test pattern of the 1950s and 1960s have long since been relegated to history. The SMPTE color bars occasionally turn up, but with most North American broadcasters now following a 24-hour schedule, these too have become a rare sight.

With the introduction of color TV, electronically generated test cards were introduced. They are named after their generating equipment (ex: Grundig VG1000, Philips PM5544, Telefunken FuBK, etc.), TV station (ex: BBC test card) or organization (ex: SMPTE color bars, EBU colour bars).

In developed countries such as Australia, Canada, the United Kingdom, and the United States, the financial imperatives of commercial television broadcasting mean that air-time is now typically filled with programmes and commercials (such as infomercials) 24 hours a day, and non-commercial broadcasters have to match this.

A late test card design, introduced in 2005 and fully adapted for HD, SD, 16:9 and 4:3 broadcasts, is defined on ITU-R Rec. BT.1729. It offers markings specificity design to test format conversions, chroma sampling, etc.

Formerly a common sight, test cards are now only rarely seen outside of television studios, post-production, and distribution facilities. In particular, they are no longer intended to assist viewers in calibration of television sets. Several factors have led to their demise for this purpose:

- Modern microcontroller-controlled analogue televisions rarely if ever need adjustment, so test cards are much less important than previously. Likewise, modern cameras and camcorders seldom need adjustment for technical accuracy, though they are often adjusted to compensate for scene light levels, and for various artistic effects.
- Use of digital interconnect standards, such as CCIR 601 and SMPTE 292M, which operate without the non-linearities and other issues inherent to analog broadcasting, do not introduce color shifts or brightness changes; thus the requirement to detect and compensate for them using this reference signal has been virtually eliminated. (Compare with the obsolescence of stroboscopes as used to adjust the speed of record players.) On the other hand, digital test signal generators do include test signals which are intended to stress the digital interface, and many sophisticated generators allow the insertion of jitter, bit errors, and other pathological conditions that can cause a digital interface to fail.
- Likewise, use of digital broadcasting standards, such as DVB and ATSC, eliminates the issues introduced by modulation and demodulation of analog signals.
- Test cards including large circles were used to confirm the linearity of the set's deflection systems. As solid-state components replaced vacuum tubes in receiver deflection circuits, linearity adjustments were less frequently required (few newer sets have user-adjustable "VERT SIZE" and "VERT LIN" controls, for example). In LCD and other deflectionless displays, the linearity is a function of the display panel's manufacturing quality; for the display to work, the tolerances will already be far tighter than human perception.

For custom-designed video installations, such as LED displays in buildings or at live events, some test images are custom-made to fit the specific size and shape of the setup in question. These custom test images can also be an opportunity for the technicians to hide inside jokes for the crew to see while installing equipment for a show.

== Monoscope ==
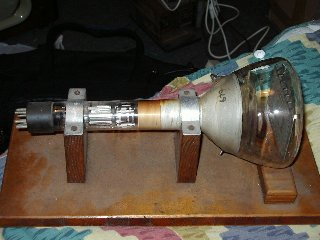
A monoscope

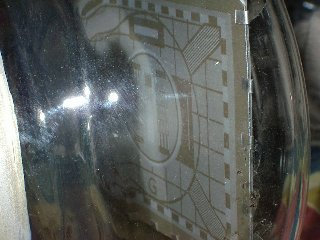
Close-up of the test-card image from a monoscope

Rather than physical test cards, which had to be televised using a camera, television stations often used a special purpose camera tube which had the test pattern painted on the inside screen of the tube. Each tube was only capable of generating the one test image, hence it was called a monoscope.

Monoscopes were similar in construction to an ordinary cathode-ray tube (CRT), only instead of displaying an image on its screen it scanned a built-in image. The monoscope contained a formed metal target in place of the phosphor coating at its "screen" end and as the electron beam scanned the target, rather than displaying an image, a varying electrical signal was produced generating a video signal from the etched pattern. Monoscope tubes had the advantage over test cards that a full TV camera was not needed, and the image was always properly framed and in focus. They fell out of use after the 1960s as they were not able to produce color images.

== Other uses ==
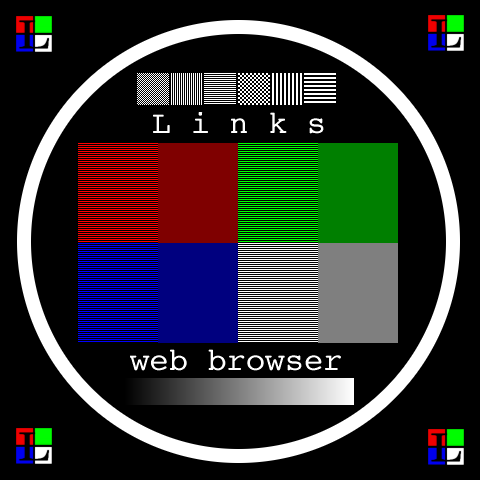
The test card bundled with the Links web browser since 2001

A lesser-known kind of test pattern is used for the calibration of photocopiers. Photocopier test patterns are physical sheets that are photocopied, with the difference in the resulting photocopy revealing any tell-tale deviations or defects in the machine's ability to copy.

There are also test patterns kits and software developed specifically for many consumer electronics. The B&K Television Analyst was developed in the 1960s for testing monochrome TV sets in the NTSC standard and was later modified for European and Australian PAL standards. Among other uses, it consisted of a flying spot scanner on which a test pattern printed on a cellulose acetate slide was shown.

When CRT monitors were still commonly used on personal computers, specific test patterns were created for proper calibration of such monitors in the cases whereby multimedia images could not be shown properly on said monitors. Some VCD and DVD lens cleaner discs, such as the Kyowa Sonic lens cleaning kits from 1997–2001, also included test patterns as well.

More recent examples include the THX Optimizer which can be accessed in the setup menu in almost every THX-certified DVD, as well as the "HDR sRGB Graphics Test (400 nits)" and "Test Patterns" series available on Netflix meant to test out streaming bandwidth on Internet-enabled devices, especially on widescreen smart HDR TVs, 4K and 8K displays and also used to sync audio and video feeds, which can be affected, among other factors, by Bluetooth and Internet latency.

Test patterns are also used to calibrate CCTV cameras and monitors, as well as medical imaging displays and equipment for telemedicine and diagnostic purposes, such as the SMPTE RP-133 medical diagnostic imaging test pattern specification for medical and surgical displays, created around 1983–86; as well as a later derivative called the TG18-QC test pattern created by the AAPM in 2001. Test patterns to calibrate X-ray machines, in particular those manufactured by Leeds Test Objects in England, also exist as well.

== In numismatics ==
Television has had such an impact in today's life that it has been the main motif for numerous collectors' coins and medals. One of the most recent examples is The 50 Years of Television commemorative coin minted on 9 March 2005, in Austria. The obverse of the coin shows the centre portion of the Telefunken T05 test card, while the reverse shows several milestones in the history of television.

== In popular culture ==
The Philips Pattern and SMPTE color bars are widely recognised as one of the iconic popular culture symbols of the 1980s and 1990s in the markets where they were used. Numerous novelty and collectible items has been patterned after the famous test card, including wall clocks, bedsheets, wristwatches, and clothing. The character Sheldon Cooper on The Big Bang Theory wore tees with both patterns and a blogger identified the SMPTE shirt's use in more than a dozen episodes over the life of the series.

The BBC Test Card F features throughout the 2006-07 TV sci-fi detective series Life on Mars.

== Test card music ==
In Britain, music rather than radio sound was usually played with the test card. The music played by the BBC, and afterwards ITV, was library music, which was licensed on more favourable terms for frequent use than commercially available alternatives. Later, Channel 4 used UK library LPs from publishers like KPM, Joseph Weinberger and Ready Music.

Until September 1955, the BBC used live playing 78 RPM commercial records as an audio background to the test cards. After that date, they switched to using recorded music on tape. The following year, the BBC began to build up its own library of specially produced music for the half hour tapes – initially three tunes in similar style, followed by an identification sign (the three notes B-B-C played on celesta). ITV (which began its first trade transmissions in 1957) continued to use commercially available recordings until the late 1960s, when it also began to make specially produced tapes.

For rights reasons, much of the music was recorded by light music orchestras in France and Germany, though sometimes by British musicians, or top international session players using pseudonyms, such as The Oscar Brandenburg Orchestra (an amalgamation of Neil Richardson, Alan Moorhouse and Johnny Pearson) or the Stuttgart Studio Orchestra. Other composers and bandleaders commissioned for this type of work included Gordon Langford, Ernest Tomlinson. Roger Roger, Heinz Kiessling, Werner Tautz, Frank Chacksfield and Syd Dale.

During the 1980s, the test card was seen less and less - it was pushed out first by Teletext pages and then by extended programme hours. The same tapes were used to accompany both the test card and Ceefax on BBC channels, but some fans argue that new tapes introduced after Ceefax became the norm in 1983 were less musically interesting.

To this day, the Korean Central Television still plays various popular, patriotic songs or classical musical works from North Korea, and during the last minute before sign-on, a looping interval signal rendition of the first seven notes of the Song of General Kim Il Sung is always played.

== List of TV test cards ==
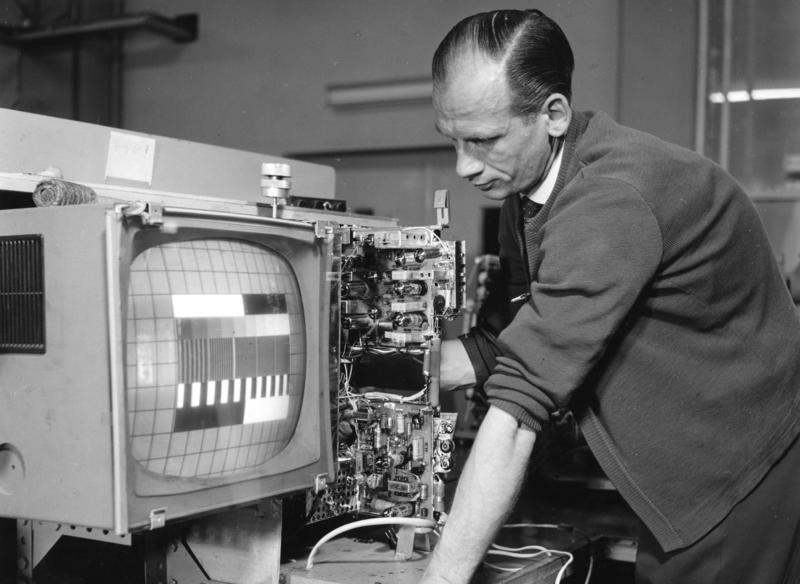
A newly built television set undergoing image calibration using a test card at a Grundig factory in Nuremberg, West Germany (December 1959)

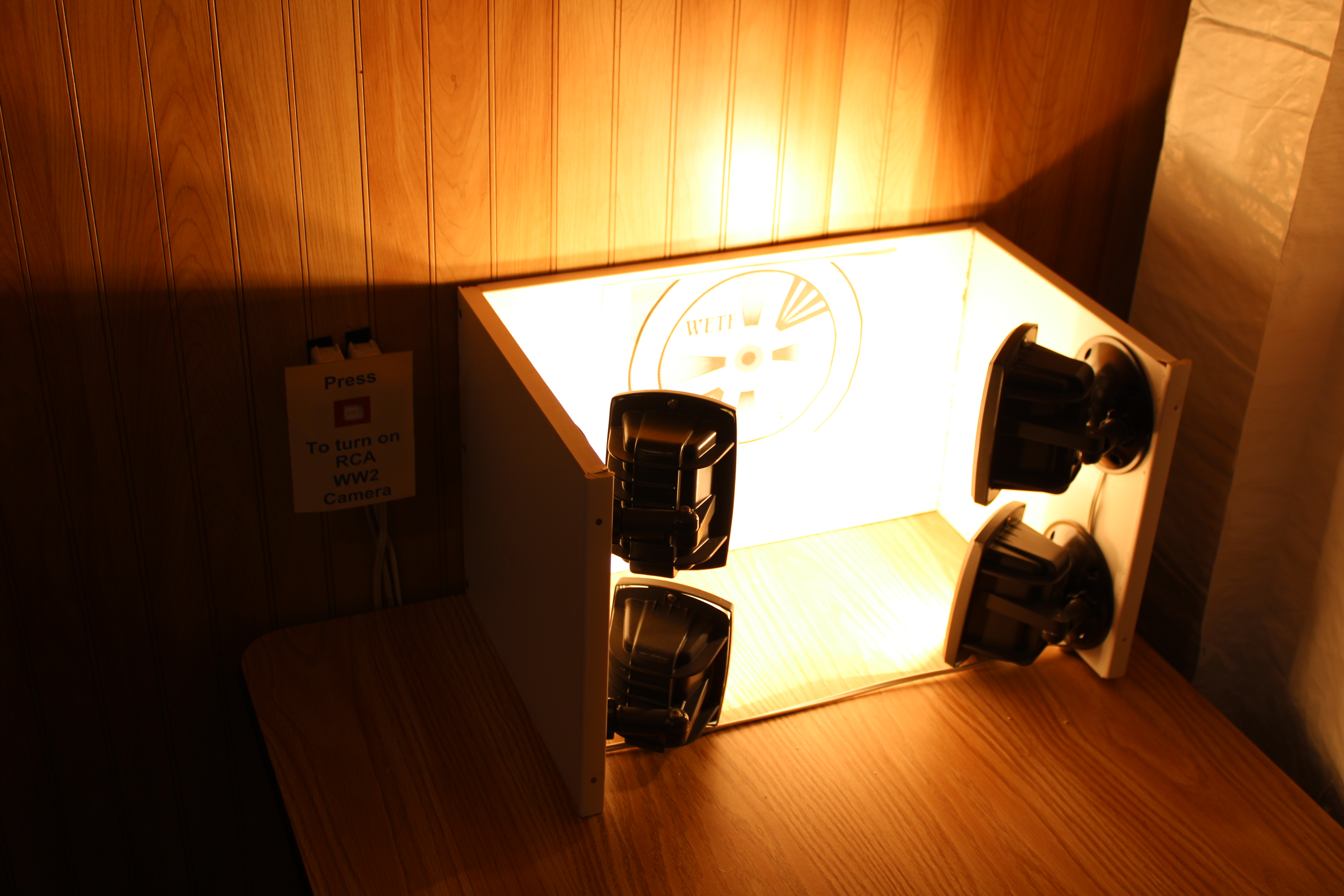
A 1940s-style "bullseye" test pattern exhibited at the Early Television Museum in Hilliard, Ohio (June 2022)

- BBC Tuning Signals and Test Cards A, B, C, D, E, F, G, H, J, W, X (1934–2006, Mechanical 30- and 240-lines, Monochrome, PAL, SDTV, HDTV, 405- and 625-lines)
- RCA Victor monochrome test pattern (with RCA logos and Nipper the dog illustrations at corners; c. 1933/34–1937, 343-lines)
- RCA/NBC monochrome test patterns #1 and #2 (1938–39, 441-lines)
- RCA Indian-head test pattern (1939, 525-lines)
- ABC/CBS/Crosley-Avco/DuMont/NBC monochrome "bullseye" test patterns (c. 1939–47, 525-lines)
- RMA 1946 resolution chart (1946, 525- and 625-lines)
- Marconi Resolution Chart No. 1/English Electric Valve Company Test Chart (c. 1947/c. 1970, 525- and 625-lines)
- ТИТ-0249, ИТ-72 and таблица 0286 monochrome test cards (1949, c. 1975–78, c. 1990–92, used in Soviet Union and Russia)
- DuMont Industrial Color Television test pattern (1950, experimentally shown on KE2XDR)
- DFF (Deutscher Fernsehfunk) monochrome (Q1/QI1, Test nr. 04, modified EBU monochrome) and colour (modified HTV TR.0782) test patterns (1952–1991, SECAM, used in East Germany)
- Radiodiffusion-Télévision Française "Marly Horses" test card (1953, 819-lines)
- ТИТ-0154 colour test card (1954, abandoned prototype Soviet Union NIIR/SECAM IV system)
- ITA/GPO/Belling & Lee G9AED Pilot Test Transmission test cards (1955–56, 405-lines)
- Associated-Rediffusion–Marconi "diamond" monochrome test card versions 1, 2 and 3 (1955–1958, 625-lines; Version 1 also used by RTV in British Hong Kong, TVM in Crown Colony of Malta and WNTV in the western part of Colonial Nigeria)
- EIA 1956 resolution chart (1956, 525- and 625-lines)
- Chequerboard optical and electronic "tea towel" test cards (1950s/60s, monochrome, 625-lines, used in varying forms in West Germany, Italy, Netherlands, Soviet Union, Portugal and Spain)
- SMPTE optical monochrome test card (1950s?, 525-lines; 1962–1964, 625-lines)
- Philips PM 5522, 5534, PM 5538, PM 5540, PM 5543, PM 5544, PM 5552, PM 5634, PM 5644 (1960s, 525- and 625-lines, PAL, PALplus, SECAM, NTSC), see Philips circle pattern
- Telefunken T 05 (early-1960s, 625-lines)
- EBU electronic monochrome test pattern (1960s?, 625-lines)
- CBS/NBC color "bullseye" test patterns (c. 1964/65–early-1990s, NTSC)
- Telefunken FuBK (late-1960s, PAL)
- UEIT - Universal Electronic Test Chart (1970, SECAM)
- HTV TR.0782 test card (1970s, SECAM, used in Hungary, Poland, East Germany and Romania)
- EZO test card (1971, PAL, used in Czechoslovakia and Estonian SSR)
- BNT electronic test card (1972, SECAM, used in Bulgaria)
- TVE colour test card (1975, PAL)
- SMPTE color bars (1977, NTSC, HDTV, SDTV)
- EBU colour bars
- Electronic Test Pattern 1 (1979, PAL)
- Grundig VG 1001 (1980, PAL)
- Toolcraft-Goodwood colour test card (c. 1980s–2000s?, PAL, used on various Australian commercial TV stations)
- KCTV colour test cards (1970s?, mid-1990s, 2017, SECAM then PAL, used in North Korea)
- Snell & Wilcox SW2 (1990s, TPG20/21 Test Pattern Generators) and SW4 "Zone Plate" (2000s, NTSC, PAL, SDTV)
- GY/T 254-2011 test card (2011, HDTV, DTMB, used in Mainland China)
- GY/T 413-2024 test card (2024, 4K/8K UHDTV, used in mainland China)

== See also ==
- Blue only mode
- China Girl (filmmaking)
- Colour chart
- List of BBC test cards
- Test Card F
- Webdriver Torso, YouTube account used for automated performance testing
