= Digital video effect =

Live video image manipulation

Digital video effects (DVEs) are visual effects that provide comprehensive live video image manipulation, in the same form as optical printer effects in film. DVEs differ from standard video switcher effects (often referred to as analog effects) such as wipes or dissolves, in that they deal primarily with resizing, distortion or movement of the image. Modern video switchers often contain internal DVE functionality. Modern DVE devices are incorporated in high-end broadcast video switchers.

Early examples of DVE devices found in the broadcast post-production industry include the Ampex Digital Optics (ADO), Quantel DPE-5000, Vital Squeezoom, NEC E-Flex and the Abekas A5x series of DVEs. By 1988, Grass Valley Group caught up with the competition with their Kaleidoscope, which integrated ADO-type effects with their widely used line of broadcast switching gear.

DVEs are used by the broadcast television industry in live television production environments like television studios and outside broadcasts. They are commonly used in video post-production.

== See also ==
- Character generator
- Digital audio workstation
- Quantel Mirage, a DVE advanced for its time
