= A Very English Murder =

1974 film by Samson Samsonov

- Directed by: Samson Samsonov
- Screenplay by: Edgar Smirnov; Vadim Yusov
- Starring: Aleksey Batalov; Leonid Obolensky; Georgy Taratorkin
- Music by: Eduard Artemyev
- Production company: Mosfilm
- Release date: 1974
- Running time: 165 minutes
- Country: Soviet Union
- Language: Russian

A Very English Murder (Russian: Чисто английское убийство, romanized: Chisto angliyskoe ubiystvo) is a 1974 Soviet teleplay directed by Samson Samsonov, based on the 1951 novel An English Murder by Cyril Hare.

The film begins as relatives and friends come to Lord Warbeck's family castle for Christmas. Suddenly, during dinner, Robert Warbeck, the only son and heir of the old Lord, dies in front of the guests. Then Lord Warbeck himself dies. And then — one of the ladies guests in the house... Because of snow drifts police can not reach the house; the only police present is the Minister's guard, and not an investigator. Foreigner doctor Bottwink — a historian, invited by Lord Warbeck to work in his old library — is the only one who is able to understand what had happened. However, the investigation is complicated by the fact that almost all those present are connected with each other by strange, unpleasant and sometimes unexpected relationships.

== Plot ==
The film is set in the United Kingdom, within the walls of Lord Thomas Warbeck's ancestral castle near Chatham, where he gathers family and friends for what he knows will be his final Christmas. Gravely ill and given only until Christmas Eve to live, the aging lord wishes to savor one last moment of familial unity, but beneath the festive veneer lies a web of animosity and unresolved tensions. His son and sole heir, Robert Warbeck, a fervent leader of a radical youth movement, shares open hostility with his cousin, Sir Julius Warbeck, a prominent politician and Her Majesty’s Minister of Finance. The guest list includes Mrs. Carstairs, the wife of the Minister's assistant; Lady Camilla Prendergast, who grew up alongside Robert; and the pastor's daughter, a lifelong friend of the Warbeck family. Among the long-term residents of the castle are Dr. Bottwink, a European émigré historian studying the Warbeck archives, and the loyal butler Briggs, who struggles to prevent his daughter Susannah from making an outburst that might disrupt the gathering. Despite Lord Warbeck’s desire for a peaceful celebration, the strained relationships among the attendees create an atmosphere of quiet unease.

As the Christmas Eve dinner reaches its climax, the festive mood is shattered when Robert suddenly collapses and dies after drinking champagne, leaving the guests in shock. The following morning, Lord Warbeck succumbs to grief upon hearing of his son’s death, and soon after, one of the female guests also perishes under mysterious circumstances. With snowstorms cutting off access to the castle, the responsibility of investigating these sudden deaths falls to Sir Julius's bodyguard, the only figure of authority present, though he is far from a trained detective. The investigation grows increasingly complex as the connections between the guests reveal unexpected secrets, hidden grievances, and troubling alliances, leaving the motive for the murders shrouded in mystery. As tensions mount and the body count rises, it becomes clear that the key to the puzzle lies with Dr. Botwink, the outsider historian, whose unique perspective allows him to untangle the intricate web of relationships and uncover the truth behind the unfolding tragedy.

== Changes from the novel ==
Overall, the film closely follows the novel. The introduction is compressed. The excursion undertaken by Sir Julius to a nearby village (Chapter XIV in the novel) has been removed.

Noticeable changes were made to soften the political conflict depicted in the novel.

- In the novel, Doctor Wenceslaus Bottwink, Ph.D., professor of history, is said to be born in Hungary, having Jewish and Russian blood. Fortunate to escape a Nazi concentration camp, he found himself on the shores of Great Britain. In the film, neither the first name nor ethnicity of Doctor Bottwink is revealed, although he is mentioned as a citizen of Austria, then Czechoslovakia, then Germany as the Second World War progressed.
- In the novel, the League of Liberty and Justice, organized by Robert Warbeck, is a fascist organization. In the film the League is described only as extremist.
- In the novel, Warbeck is clearly antisemitic. Unable to contain his political leanings even when talking to Lady Camilla, he bursts, "Has your new Jew friend asked you to go back to Palestine with him yet?" In the film this dialogue has been removed, although the nationalistic character of Robert's organization is established.
- In the novel, Sergeant Rogers asks Bottwink whether the Doctor was in Vienna during Dolfuss régime, and Bottwink clarifies that he was anti-Dolfuss, anti-clerical, and anti-Fascist. This dialog is removed from the film.
- In the novel, Sir Julius identifies himself as socialist. When thinking back about the murders that occurred in Warbeck Hall, he comes to a conclusion that it was him who was targeted, and he was spared only by chance. "Who are the real enemies of communism today? Why, we are — the democratic socialists of Western Europe!" exclaims Sir Julius, blaming Doctor Bottwink in the murders. This exchange is removed from the film, and Sir Julius is never called a socialist.
- Like the novel, the film reveals that Doctor Bottwink is a communist sympathizer, but omits to mention his anti-Stalinist stance.
- In the novel, Sir Julius and Mrs. Carstairs argue about the looting of the Winter Palace at Beijing and the suppression of the Boxer revolt by Eight-Nation Alliance. This argument is removed from the film.

== Cast ==
- Aleksey Batalov as Doctor Bottwink
- Leonid Obolensky as old Lord Thomas Warbeck (voiced by Andrei Fajt)
- Georgy Taratorkin as Hon. Robert Warbeck
- Boris Ivanov as Sir Julius Warbeck
- Ivan Pereverzev as Briggs, the Butler (voiced by Yevgeny Vesnik)
- Irina Muravyova as Susan Briggs (voiced by Alla Budnitskaya)
- Faime Jürno as Lady Camilla Prendergast (voiced by Irina Kartashyova)
- Eugenija Pleškytė as Mrs. Carstairs
- Einari Koppel as sergeant Rogers
