= He Should Have Died Hereafter =

1958 novel

- UK First edition
- Author: Cyril Hare
- Language: English
- Series: Francis Pettigrew; Inspector Mallett
- Genre: Detective
- Publisher: Faber and Faber; MacMillan (US)
- Publication date: 1958
- Publication place: United Kingdom
- Media type: Print
- Preceded by: That Yew Tree's Shade

He Should Have Died Hereafter is a 1958 detective novel by the British writer Cyril Hare. It is the fifth and last in his series featuring amateur detective Francis Pettigrew, a retired barrister. It also features an appearance of Inspector Mallet, a former officer of Scotland Yard who had last appeared in the author's With a Bare Bodkin (1946). It was published in the United States by MacMillan under the alternative title Untimely Death.

== Synopsis ==
While holidaying with his wife in Exmoor, Pettigrew comes across a body in a beauty spot he had last visited in his childhood. When he returns with members of the local stag hunt, the corpse has disappeared. A couple of days later the body reappears at another location nearby and is identified as a ne'er-do-well who is the estranged husband of the woman in whose house they are staying. Mallet has retired to the district but is hired to launch a private investigation by cousins of the deceased who believe the death may have been fraudulently concealed in order so that his wife and children should benefit from a large inheritance from his wealthy uncle. The matter ends in a convoluted case before the Court of Chancery but Pettigrew is still set on solving the murder that the local Devon police have failed to do.

== Bibliography ==
- Herbert, Rosemary. Whodunit?: A Who's Who in Crime & Mystery Writing. Oxford University Press, 2003.
- James, Russell. Great British Fictional Detectives. Remember When, 2009.
- Murphy, Bruce F. The Encyclopedia of Murder and Mystery. Springer, 1999.
- Reilly, John M. Twentieth Century Crime & Mystery Writers. Springer, 2015.
- Van Dover, J.K. The Detective and the Artist: Painters, Poets and Writers in Crime Fiction, 1840s–1970s. McFarland, 2019.
