= Suicide Excepted =

1939 novel

- Author: Cyril Hare
- Language: English
- Series: Inspector Mallett
- Genre: Detective
- Publisher: Faber and Faber
- Publication date: 1939
- Publication place: United Kingdom
- Media type: Print
- Preceded by: Death Is No Sportsman
- Followed by: Tragedy at Law

Suicide Excepted is a 1939 detective novel by the British writer Cyril Hare. It was his third novel to feature Inspector Mallett of Scotland Yard, one of the numerous investigators of the Golden Age of Detective Fiction. Mallet takes a back seat for the middle of the novel and much of the detective work is done by three amateur detectives.

== Synopsis ==
When a man dies of an apparent overdose of sleeping pills in a country hotel that had once been his family's ancestral home, Inspector Mallett is staying there for his holiday. His testimony at the inquest is a strong reason for the verdict of suicide. However as this verdict means that his lucrative life insurance is not effective due to a clause excepting suicide, his son, daughter and her fiancée set out to try and prove that he was murdered. From their Hampstead home they travel across the country trying to track down the various hotel guests in the hope of proving that one of them is a killer. In the process they discover a case of embezzlement. Meanwhile, Mallett is slowly dragged back into the case.

== Reception ==
A review in The Times noted "it needs Mr. Cyril Hare’s usual detective, Inspector Mallett, to bring Suicide Excepted to its logical, but surprising, conclusion. The author has an eye for character and writes with a quiet humour that is a pleasant change from the hell-for-leather type of crime story."

== Bibliography ==
- Hubin, Allen J. Crime Fiction, 1749-1980: A Comprehensive Bibliography. Garland Publishing, 1984.
- Magill, Frank Northen. Critical Survey of Mystery and Detective Fiction: Authors, Volume 1. Salem Press, 1988.
- Murphy, Bruce F. The Encyclopedia of Murder and Mystery. Springer, 1999.
- Reilly, John M. Twentieth Century Crime & Mystery Writers. Springer, 2015.
