= ProCoder =

ProCoder is a video-encoding and transcoding software initially developed by the Canopus Corporation, now Thomson SA.

Canopus ProCoder 1.2 was released in 2002, Canopus ProCoder 1.5 in 2003 and Canopus ProCoder 2 in 2004. In 2005 Thomson Multimedia acquired Canopus in order to bolster their Grass Valley broadcasting and network market. As of 2009 ProCoder is offered as a part of Thomson Grass Valley video products under the name Grass Valley ProCoder. Grass Valley ProCoder 3.0 was released in 2007.

== See also ==
- List of video editing software
