= When the Wind Blows =

When the Wind Blows may refer to:

== Film and television ==
- When the Wind Blows (1930 film), a comedy short in the Our Gang series
- When the Wind Blows (1986 film), an animated film based on the graphic novel (see below)
- "When the Wind Blows" (Dallas), a television episode
- "When the Wind Blows" (The Fugitive), a television episode

== Literature ==
- When the Wind Blows, a 1931 novel by Marguerite Steen
- When the Wind Blows, a 1949 detective novel by Cyril Hare
- When the Wind Blows, a 1956 novel by Noel Gerson
- When the Wind Blows, a 1981 novel by John Saul
- When the Wind Blows (comics), a 1982 graphic novel by Raymond Briggs
- When the Wind Blows (Patterson novel), a 1998 novel by James Patterson

== Music ==
=== Albums ===
- When the Wind Blows (soundtrack), from the 1986 film
- When the Wind Blows, by Creedle, 1996
- When the Wind Blows, by Eric Bogle, 1984

=== Songs ===
- "When the Wind Blows" (song), from the 1986 film, by David Bowie
- "When the Wild Wind Blows", by Bomb Factory from Another Day, Another Life
- "When the Wild Wind Blows", by Iron Maiden from The Final Frontier
- "When the Wild Wind Blows", by Mansun, a B-side of the single "Negative"
- "When the Wild Wind Blows", by Point of Grace from Steady On
- "When the Wild Wind Blows", by Yoona from A Walk to Remember

== See also ==
- Where the Wind Blows, a 2022 Hong Kong crime thriller film
