= Test screening =

Film or television previews for feedback

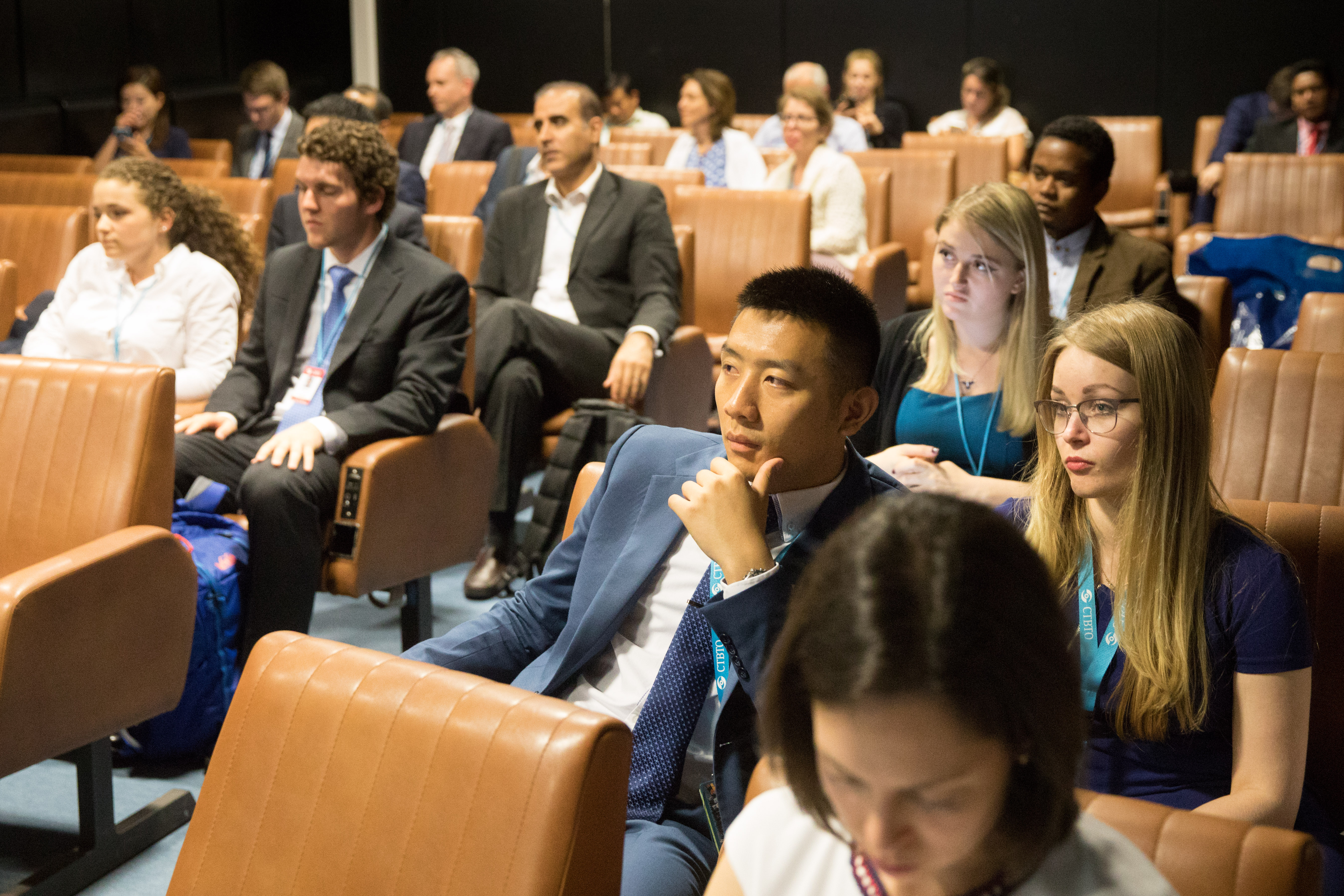
Movie screening of When the Wind Blows in Vienna, Austria.

A test screening, or test audience, is a preview screening of a film or television series before its general release to gauge audience reaction. Preview audiences are selected from a cross-section of the population and are usually asked to complete a questionnaire or provide feedback in some form. Harold Lloyd is credited with inventing the concept, having used it as early as 1928. Test screenings evolved from these early examples into a systematic practice. According to research from Kevin Goetz's book "Audience-ology: How Moviegoers Shape the Films We Love" (2021), by the 1970s, studios formalized the process as they invested more heavily in marketing and distribution strategies. Today, approximately 90 percent of widely released studio films undergo test screenings, with the average movie being tested three times. Test screenings have been recommended for starting filmmakers "even if a film festival is fast approaching".

== Notable examples and outcomes of test screenings ==
In 2004, Roger Ebert, the late reviewer for the Chicago Sun-Times, wrote that test screenings by filmmakers are "valid" to get an idea of an audience response to a rough cut. But "too often, however, studio executives use preview screenings as a weapon to enforce their views on directors, and countless movies have had stupid happy endings tacked on after such screenings." Ebert writes that Billy Wilder dropped the first reel from Sunset Boulevard after a test screening. Producer Tim Bevan emphasizes that the goal of the film editing process is to turn unedited film "into 85 to 110 minutes of story that people are going to want to go and see", and he "absolutely believes in the testing process. 99.9 times out of 100 the audience will speak louder than anybody else". Even though "editing rooms can be very combative places" with directors, the test results make the process "less combative." While filming Johnny English (2003) with director Peter Howitt, testing led to reshoots of the beginning of the film to set up the character better, and "test scores leaped considerably."

Research published in the book "Audience-ology" documented how La La Land (2016) was significantly improved after test audiences were confused by a musical that did not establish its genre early enough. Director Damien Chazelle subsequently reinstated an elaborate opening freeway sequence that had been cut, helping viewers understand immediately that they were watching a musical. Similarly, Titanic (1997) benefited from test screenings where the audience's enthusiastic reaction helped convince skeptical studio executives of the film's commercial potential despite its unprecedented budget.

Edgar Wright, writer and director of Shaun of the Dead, said in an interview that in test screenings done before the film's special effects were completed, audiences remarked that the ending was "a bit abrupt" and "lame". After being given a low budget and two days to finish shooting, the filmmakers added a "15 second" ending, which follow-up press screening audiences liked, leading to one reviewer changing his earlier bad review, giving "an extra star". Dan Myrick and Ed Sanchez, directors of The Blair Witch Project said, "We had a 2 1/2 hour cut [...] We had no idea what we had, so we had to show it to an audience and get their reaction." At this screening, the filmmakers met their future producer.

Feedback from a test screening may be used to alter the movie before it is released. This may be as simple as changing the title of the film (as in the case of the film that became Licence to Kill), or it may be more substantial. Cases exist of where test screenings prompted filmmakers to completely change the ending of a movie (by having a character die who would have survived, or vice versa, for instance); one example is Little Shop of Horrors. Test screenings showed negative audience reactions to onscreen kissing between Denzel Washington and Julia Roberts (in The Pelican Brief); the test response to his onscreen kiss with Mimi Rogers (in The Mighty Quinn) led to the scene being cut. Director John Carpenter has been quoted as saying "We've just had a test screening, and the upshot is we're throwing out the first reel, and starting with reel two" during the pre-dubbing for Escape from New York.

In a test screening for the Harrison Ford spy thriller Clear and Present Danger, the audience started to applaud during the main villain's climactic death scene, but "it was over before they could"; this resulted in reshoots. According to the director, Phillip Noyce, screening a trimmed-down version of the film for test audiences resulted in "more people thinking it was longer, than when it was long", supporting the studio's insistence on a 142-minute version.

Different test audiences can produce startlingly different results. After agreeing on what they thought would be a final "lean and mean" cut, and validating it with a test audience, producer/screenwriter Chris Jones and director Genevieve Jolliffe, of Urban Ghost Story, presented a test screening for some "industry people", who declared the film "too slow." This result caused the two filmmakers to argue extensively between themselves, but they tried cutting 15 minutes from the first 25, the "baggy" part. Jones relates that the results left them with "our jaws on the floor, saying 'why on earth did we leave all that junk in?'"

According to a June 2008 article from The Guardian, "Two weeks before the release of The Bourne Supremacy (2004), director Paul Greengrass got together with its star, Matt Damon, came up with a new ending and phoned the producers saying the new idea was "way" better, it would cost $200,000 and involve pulling Damon from the set of Ocean's 12 for a re-shoot. Reluctantly the producers agreed—the movie tested 10 points higher with the new ending".

During test screenings of Wolfgang Petersen's Troy, test audiences reacted negatively to the film. The producers reported that audiences listed Gabriel Yared's unfinished score as a factor, calling it "too brassy and bold" and "too old fashioned". On the screening prints, Yared's score had lacked the intended choir parts to balance the "brassy" parts. The filmmakers sought a replacement composer before informing Yared of his firing, and asked James Horner to write a new score in two weeks. In later reviews, several film score critics describe Yared's score as superior to Horner's.

Director Ridley Scott "snuck in" to the first test screening of American Gangster and stayed because "no one moved" in the audience, indicating that they were "fully engaged". Some screenings are intended only to determine how best to market a film; director Kevin Smith writes that he "hates" test screenings, and "doesn't know any filmmaker" who enjoys the process, but describes a very good audience response and focus group in Kansas City, MO at the sole marketing test screening for Clerks II.

In television, test screenings may be used before a series debuts, to help fine-tune the concept (as with Sesame Street, leading to the Muppets appearing onscreen with human characters, rather than in separate segments), or to pre-test specific episodes.

Adam West, in his book Back to the Batcave, stated that test screenings for the 1960s Batman television series incorporated audience-controlled dials monitored by computer. Shown to about one hundred recruited audience members, the pilot episode received "the worst score in the history of pilot testing", in the "high 40s", where the average pilot score was in the mid-60s. Several adjustments were made to the show and retested, including a laugh track, then narration; the test results were the same. The decision was made to add "huge new special effects gags that would look great in promos."

Wes Craven's film Deadly Friend had a test screening by Warner Bros. that was set up for audiences mostly consisting of Craven's fans, as he had a large fan base after the critical and commercial success of his previous theatrically released film, A Nightmare on Elm Street. The audience reaction was overwhelmingly negative, criticizing the lack of graphic violence and gore that was shown in Craven's previous films. Warner Bros. eventually discovered Craven's fan base and forced writer Bruce Joel Rubin to write six additional splatter sequences into his script. Craven and Rubin virtually disowned the film by that point.

During post-production of Carlo Carlei's 2013 adaptation of Romeo and Juliet, test screening audiences disliked the film, and cited James Horner's score as one of its weaknesses. After the film's producers argued with Carlei about replacing the score, they commissioned Abel Korzeniowski to write a replacement score. The film was once again screened, with one version having Horner's score, the other having Korzeniowski's new score. The producers then chose to reject Horner's score because the screening with Korzeniowski's score had gotten higher ratings from the audience.

== Industry perspectives ==
Many filmmakers recognize the value test screenings bring to the creative process. Edgar Wright, director of "Shaun of the Dead," embraces the process, noting it helps "take the pulse of the room, to see whether something is playing well, if something is unclear, if the length is making people antsy." The process has adapted to new media consumption patterns, with companies like Screen Engine/ASI developing online testing systems that allow executives to monitor viewers' reactions in their homes, reflecting how streaming audiences consume content.

On other hand, some directors, such as Guillermo del Toro, prefer to avoid general public screenings and keep the test in an inner circle of other artists.

== See also ==
- Film screening
- Screener
- Pomona § In popular culture
- Focus group
