= Oh God, What Now? =

British political podcast

- Genre: Political commentary, interview
- Format: Twice weekly (Tuesday and Friday) (Note: People who back the show on Patreon, get the show a day earlier as a benefit)
- Country of origin: United Kingdom
- Language: English

Cast and voices
- Hosted by: Dorian Lynskey, Ian Dunt, Naomi Smith, Ros Taylor, Andrew Harrison, Alex Andreou

Music
- Opening theme: Demon is a Monster by Cornershop (Note: Originally until 20 September 2017, "Pane In The Glass" by Lee Rosevere)

Production
- Length: approximately 60 minutes

Publication
- Original release: May 2017
- Provider: Podmasters

Related
- Related shows: The Bunker, The Bunker Daily, The Culture Bunker, Doomsday Watch
- Website: https://www.podmasters.co.uk/oh-god-what-now

Oh God, What Now? formerly known as Remainiacs, is a British hour-long twice-weekly political podcast about Brexit, speaking from the pro-Remain point of view. It was started on 26 May 2017 as Remainiacs after the European Union membership referendum as "a no-holds-barred podcast for everyone who won't shut up about Brexit". In October 2020, Remainiacs was renamed "Oh God, What Now?", due to Brexit having gone through and the changing nature of the British government.

Former podcast album cover

== Description ==
It is presented by The Guardian's Dorian Lynskey, journalist Ros Taylor, and journalist and former music magazine editor Andrew Harrison, who was also the producer. Former guests political commentator Nina Schick and Minnie Rahman, Interim Chief Executive of the Joint Council for the Welfare of Immigrants later became regular panelists as well. Former regulars include newspaper columnist for i newspaper Ian Dunt, Best for Britain's Naomi Smith and actor and columnist Alex Andreou.

It follows a format of half the show in a rundown of the news about Brexit with discussion along with a weekly guest, and then the other half with a straight interview with the guest in question. The podcast was both named one of the "Best Podcasts of 2017" by The Guardian's Miranda Sawyer, and nominated for a podcasting award, the 2018 Broadcasting Press Guild Awards' "Podcast of the Year", however it lost to Ed Miliband's Reasons to Be Cheerful. The show is recorded at Podmasters’ own studio in Highbury, North London.

As well as the weekly show, there is a series of “Remainiacs Live” and “Oh God, What Now? Live” shows at which the hosts spoke among themselves about Brexit. Venues included The Phoenix gastropub in Cavendish Square, Marylebone, the Stoke Newington Literary Festival, Leeds City Varieties, the Epstein Theatre in Liverpool, Hove's The Old Market Theatre and regularly at the Leicester Square Theatre. Remainiacs was part of the Podcast Live: Politics day long festival of different political podcasts on 7 April 2019 at Friends House, Camden.

== Notable guests ==
Notable guests have included:

- Heidi Alexander (Note: At the time of recording, she was a Labour MP for Lewisham East,)
- John Bercow
- Tony Blair
- Vince Cable MP
- Alastair Campbell
- Nick Clegg
- Nick Cohen
- Seb Dance MEP
- Gavin Esler
- A. C. Grayling
- David Allen Green
- David Lammy MP
- Caroline Lucas MP
- Deborah Meaden
- Gina Miller
- Oliver Norgrove, a former Vote Leave staffer
- James O’Brien
- Femi Oluwole, from Our Future Our Choice
- Matthew Parris
- Jay Rayner
- David Schneider
- Molly Scott Cato MEP
- Zoe Williams

== The Bunker ==
The Bunker
- Genre: Political commentary, interview
- Format: Daily
- Country of origin: United Kingdom
- Language: English

Creative team
- Created by: Podmasters

Cast and voices
- Hosted by: Four of the following people: Alex Andreou, Marie Le Conte, Ian Dunt, Gavin Esler, Miatta Fahnbulleh, Andrew Harrison, Ayesha Hazarika, Dorian Lynskey, Justin Quirk, Nina Schick, Yasmeen Serhan, Ahir Shah, Naomi Smith, Arthur Snell, Ros Taylor,

Production
- Length: 20-30 minutes

Publication
- Original release: January 2020
- Provider: Podmasters

Related
- Related shows: Oh God, What Now?
- Website: https://listen.podmasters.uk/bnkr

After the relative success of Remainiacs, the ending of the withdrawal period and with the extra funding from their Patreon backers, the producers of the show created an hour-long non-Brexit general politics podcast called The Bunker in January 2020. This show follows the same format as Remainiacs, but without the reference to Brexit. After just one show, it became one of top ten politics podcasts on the UK iTunes chart. Due to the large amount of news that being produced during the COVID-19 pandemic, from 26 March short one to one interviews half-hour shows were made under the title of The Bunker Daily. Success of The Bunker Daily has led to the show being a permanent feature of the podcast. There was also a Saturday culture edition of the Bunker, The Culture Bunker, which ran until Sept 2022.

== See also ==
- Opposition to Brexit in the United Kingdom
