= Edius =

Video editing software

EDIUS
- Original author: Canopus Corporation
- Developer: Grass Valley
- Release: 2003; 23 years ago
- Stable release: 11.50 / April 23, 2026; 4 months ago
- Operating system: Windows
- Type: video editing software
- License: Proprietary
- Website: www.grassvalley.com/products/subcat-editing_software

Edius is a video editing software package for PC computers running Windows.

Edius is a non-linear editor (NLE) that works with most modern video formats. The software is capable of 3D editing. The software comes bundled with a large collection of tools, including NEWBlue Video Filters, proDAD video effects along with image stabilization for unsteady shots and for audio mastering needs iZotope VST audio plug-ins such as Audio Effects Suite, AudioRestore, AGC & Mastering Effects Suite.

Edius was originally developed by the Japanese-based Canopus Corporation and first introduced for Windows XP in 2003. In 2005, the Canopus Corporation was sold to Grass Valley. The first version released by Grass Valley was Edius 4.0. Edius 5.5 (released around 2010) was the first version to support Windows Vista and Windows 7. The first version to support Windows 8 (and the first that was later discovered to also run on Windows 10) was Edius 6.5 (released June 2012). The current version (as of October 2023) is Edius 11.

== Release history ==
Version	Release date	Notes
1.0	2003	Canopus Corp of Japan releases Version 1.0 of EDIUS NLE for Windows XP. EDIUS replaced Canopus DVEdit Application which offered a very simple, yet effective timeline editing interface.
2.0	2004	Version 2.0 of EDIUS includes more powerful editing tools including more flexible control of Tracks in the User Interface. Support for HDV high definition - DV tape-based HD.
2.5	2004	Version 2.5 of EDIUS adds support for Inscriber TitlerMotion.
3.0	2005	Version 3.0 of EDIUS continues to improve the workflow.
4.0	2006	Version 4.0 of EDIUS introduces Canopus HQ AVI Codec format. Further improvements to editing timeline and file management tools. Support for Panasonic P2 format and MXF support.
4.5	August 7, 2007	
4.52	October 3, 2007	
4.6	February 18, 2008	
4.61	April 11, 2008	
5.0	September 2008	
5.01	November 5, 2008	
5.10	May 1, 2009	
5.12	July 16, 2009	
5.50	April 8, 2010	Added support for Windows Vista and Windows 7.
5.51	July 1, 2010	
6.0	October 2010	
6.01	December 2010	
6.03	July 2011	
6.06	March 2012	
6.5	June 29, 2012	Added support for Windows 8. Was later discovered to be the first version that also runs on Windows 10.
7.42	February 2015	Added support for 4k videos.
7.5	April 2015	
8.10	October 29, 2015	
8.11	April 7, 2016	
8.20	May 25, 2016	
8.22	August 16, 2016	
8.31	December 7, 2016	
8.32	March 1, 2017	
8.5	May 16, 2017	
8.51	June 15, 2017	
8.52	July 26, 2017	
9.10	Jan 29, 2018	
10.00	September 15, 2020	Marketed as EDIUS X
11	October 11, 2023	
11.50	April 23, 2026	
