= Death Is No Sportsman =

1938 novel by Cyril Hare

- Author: Cyril Hare
- Language: English
- Series: Inspector Mallett
- Genre: Detective
- Publisher: Faber and Faber
- Publication date: 1938
- Publication place: United Kingdom
- Media type: Print
- Preceded by: Tenant for Death
- Followed by: Suicide Excepted

Death Is No Sportsman is a 1938 detective novel by the British writer Cyril Hare. It was his second novel to feature Inspector Mallett of Scotland Yard. Written during the Golden Age of Detective Fiction, it was published by Faber and Faber. The sport of the title refers to angling.

== Synopsis ==
Mallett heads out to the village of Didford Magna on the banks of the River Didder, where there is a mania for fishing, to investigate the death of a businessman. The dead man was a member of party of anglers staying at the local pub the Polworthy Arms and it is here that Mallett begins his investigations.

== Bibliography ==
- Bourgeau, Art. The Mystery Lover's Companion. Crown, 1986.
- Hubin, Allen J. Crime Fiction, 1749-1980: A Comprehensive Bibliography. Garland Publishing, 1984.
- Magill, Frank Northen. Critical Survey of Mystery and Detective Fiction: Authors, Volume 1. Salem Press, 1988.
- Murphy, Bruce F. The Encyclopedia of Murder and Mystery. Springer, 1999.
- Reilly, John M. Twentieth Century Crime & Mystery Writers. Springer, 2015.
