= Marie Le Conte =

French-Moroccan journalist

- Born: December 29, 1991 (age 34); Nantes
- Education: University of Westminster
- Occupations: Journalist, Author

Marie Le Conte (born 29 December 1991) is a French-Moroccan journalist and author, based in London.

== Early life ==
Le Conte grew up in Nantes, in the Loire-Atlantique area of France. She has Moroccan heritage. She had work experience at the Ouest-France newspaper in her home region, prior to moving to London to study journalism. She graduated with a BA in journalism from the University of Westminster in 2013.

== Career ==
=== Journalist ===
As a journalist Le Conte worked from 2015 as Evening Standard political diarist, and from 2016 until 2017 was the politics correspondent for BuzzFeed News. In 2016 she was named by MHP Communications on their "30 To Watch" annual list of young journalists in the UK media industry.

She has written for the Sunday Times, The New World, The Guardian, the New Statesman and The Independent, amongst others. She was named as one of Forbes magazine’s "30 under 30" in 2018.

Le Conte wrote about the differences in experience for men and women MPs in Westminster for Elle in 2022.

She has also interviewed major female UK political figures, including Emily Thornberry for Politics Home, and Scotland’s First Minister Nicola Sturgeon in 2021 for Vogue. Other women politicians profiled for the same publication have included Zarah Sultana, Charlotte Nichols, Taiwo Owatemi, and Sarah Owen. Le Conte has guested on the current affairs podcast Oh God, What Now? and interviewed Scottish MP Mhairi Black on its sister podcast The Bunker.

She has written about British politics for Politico.eu, and has written about British attitudes from an outsider perspective. She has, with co-host Gráinne Maguire, produced a podcast called Changing Politics.

In 2019, she made headlines by calling Alexandria Ocasio-Cortez's then-boyfriend Riley Roberts a "bin raccoon", comments for which she later apologised.

=== Author ===
Le Conte wrote a collection of personal essays on race, language and identity in 2016, published by Von Zos.

Writing about Westminster politics, she authored the book Haven’t You Heard? A Guide To Westminster Gossip and Why Mischief Gets Things Done, which was published in September 2019. She wrote the book Honourable Misfits: A Brief History of Britain’s Weirdest, Unluckiest, and most Dangerous MPs in 2021.

Le Conte authored the book Escape: How a Generation Shaped, Destroyed and Survived the Internet, which was published in 2022.

== Personal life ==
Le Conte is bisexual.
