= Tenant for Death =

1937 novel

- Author: Cyril Hare
- Language: English
- Series: Inspector Mallett
- Genre: Detective
- Publisher: Faber and Faber; Dodd, Mead (US)
- Publication date: 1937
- Publication place: United Kingdom
- Media type: Print
- Followed by: Death Is No Sportsman

Tenant for Death is a 1937 detective novel by the British writer Cyril Hare. His debut novel, it was a reworking of a play Murder in Daylesford Gardens had written. It introduced his first detective character Inspector Mallett of Scotland Yard who recurs through Hare's novels including in the series featuring the lawyer and amateur detective Francis Pettigrew. In style Mallett resembles Chief Inspector French, created by Freeman Wills Crofts.

== Synopsis ==
The body of financier Lionel Ballantine, whose pyramid of companies have just collapsed owing colossal sums of money, is discovered in a house in Daylesford Gardens in South Kensington. The property was rented by a Mr James, a mysterious man who seems to have vanished into thin air. Numerous figures appear to have a motive for killing Ballantine, but they are all able to provide alibis.

== Bibliography ==
- Hubin, Allen J. Crime Fiction, 1749-1980: A Comprehensive Bibliography. Garland Publishing, 1984.
- Herbert, Rosemary. Whodunit?: A Who's Who in Crime & Mystery Writing. Oxford University Press, 2003.
- Magill, Frank Northen. Critical Survey of Mystery and Detective Fiction: Authors, Volume 1. Salem Press, 1988.
- Reilly, John M. Twentieth Century Crime & Mystery Writers. Springer, 2015.
