= Faime Jurno =

Estonian actress and model

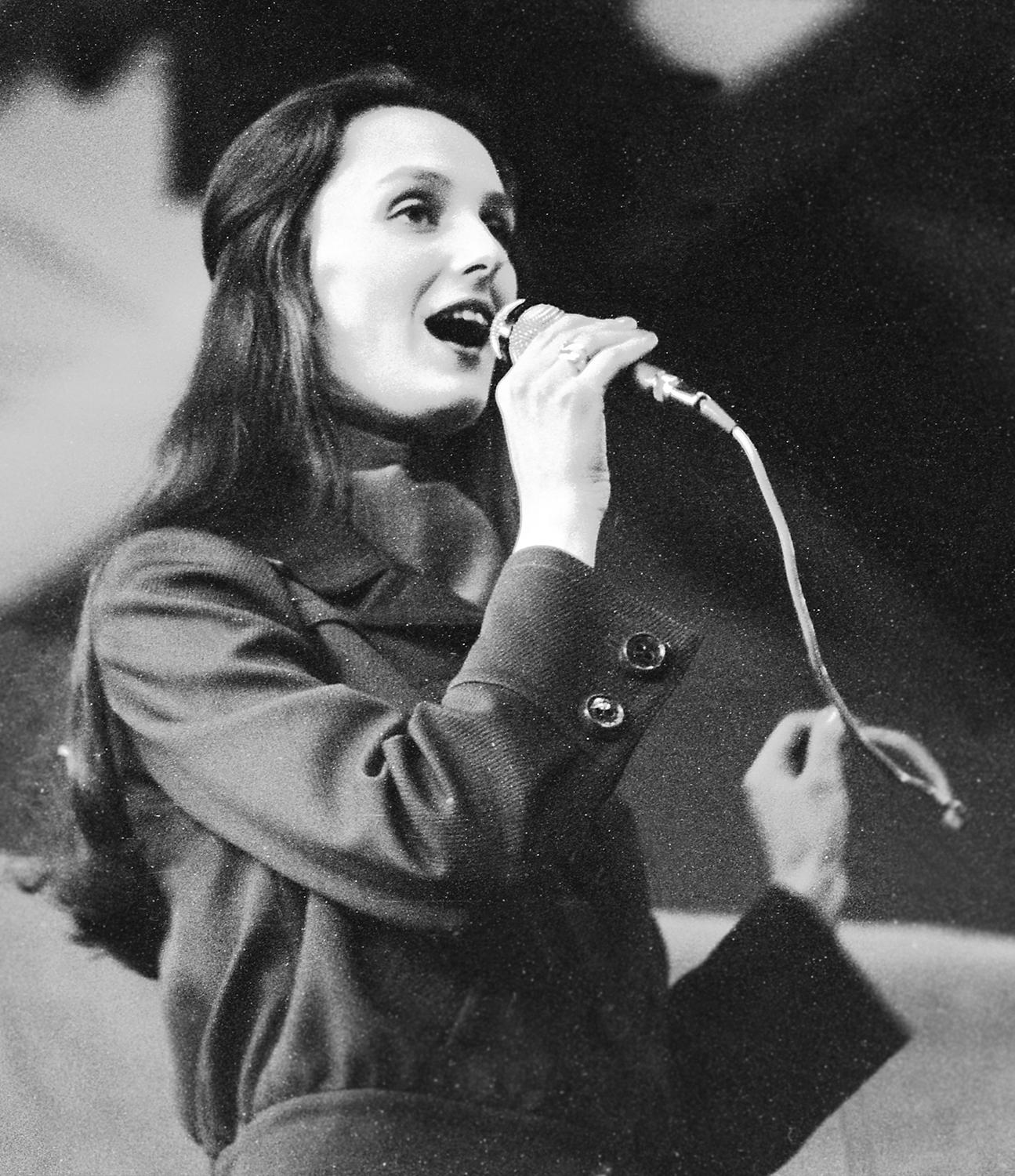
Faime Jurno in 1974

Faime Jurno (also Jürno, born Faime Sprenk; 28 February 1951) is an Estonian actress and model.

== Biography ==
=== Early life ===
Jurno was born in West Berlin to an Estonian mother, Meeta Sprenk, and a German father, Hans Prehn. Jurno's mother had married a German soldier while Estonia was under German occupation during World War II. When the Soviets were about to reoccupy Estonia in 1944, Jurno's mother fled the country with her husband and the retreating German troops and settled in Bavaria where she had a daughter; Jurno's half-sister, actress Nady Sprenk-Dorn. She later divorced her husband and moved to West Berlin where she married Jurno's father.

Jurno's parents later divorced and her mother returned to Estonia with Jurno, aged six, and her siblings in 1957, and settled in Tallinn, where Jurno attended primary and secondary schools. She graduated from Tallinn 1. Secondary School (now, Gustav Adolf Gymnasium) in 1969.

=== Career ===
Jurno began her career as a model at age fifteen for Tallinn Fashion House (Estonian: Tallinna Moemaja). Jurno was one of the premiere models for the company and modeled for them until 1992 when the company folded. Between 1970s and 1990s, she was frequently seen on the cover and in the fashion magazine Siluett. At large fashion shows in Moscow, she was usually the only representative of the Estonian SSR.

In 1970, aged nineteen, Jurno also began a career as an actress. She has appeared in both Estonian language and Russian language films.

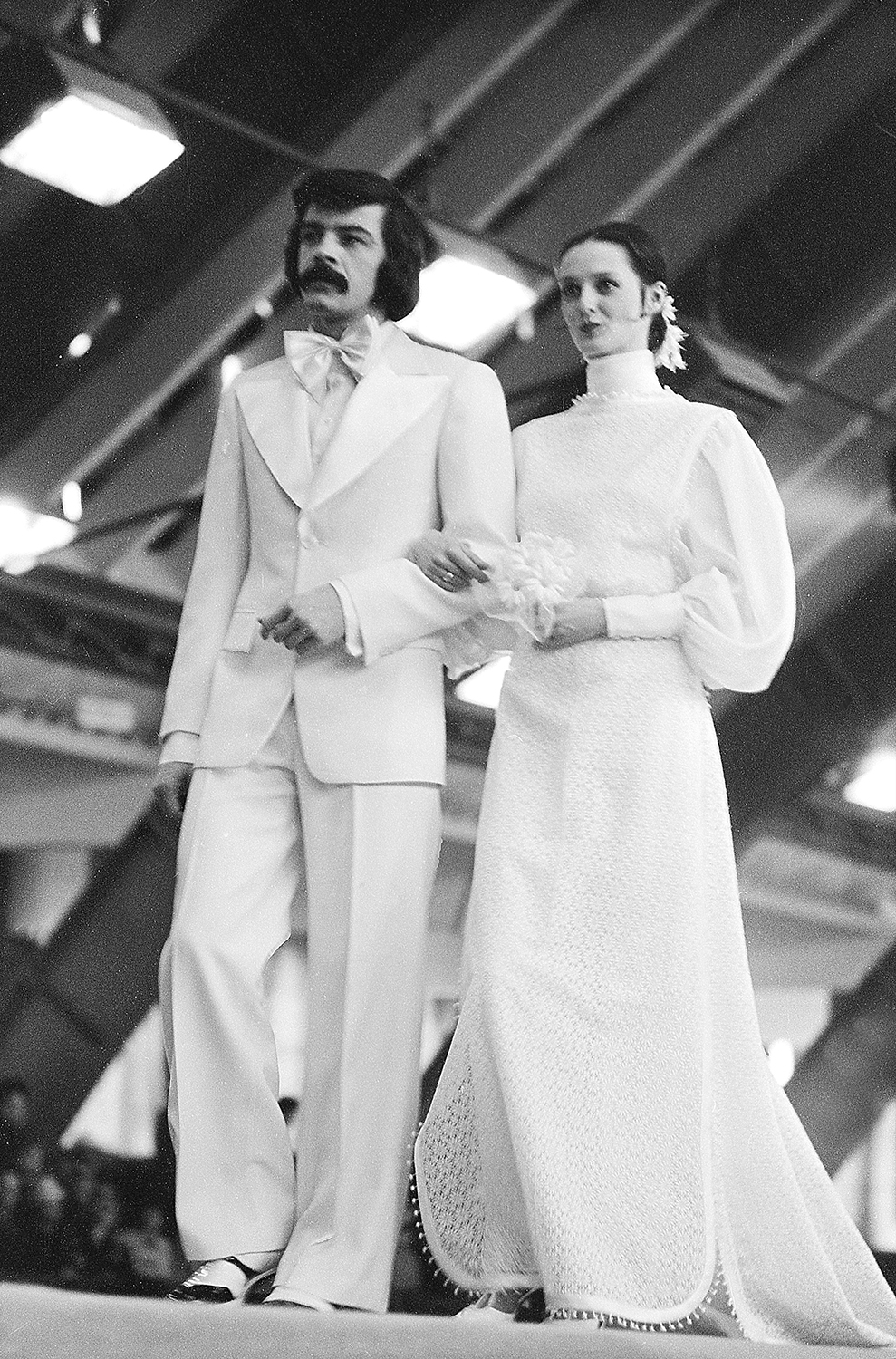
Faime Jurno modeling at a fashion show in Kalev Sports Hall in Tallinn in 1974 with Mati Sõstar

== Filmography ==
- 1970: Kolme katku vahel
- 1972: Verekivi
- 1974: A Very English Murder
- 1974: Colas Breugnon
- 1974: Legend of Siavush
- 1979: Pilot Pirx's Inquest
- 1979: Stalker
