= Roderick Snell =

British electronics engineer, born 1940 (born 1940)

Roderick Saxon Snell is a British electronics engineer, born 1940, who co-founded Snell & Wilcox in 1973, working full-time for it from 1988. The company grew to about five hundred people in the late 1990s. Snell remained on the board during the period 2002-2008 when for financial reasons the company contracted, became part-time after that and left the new company in 2011.

Snell is a visiting professor at the Business School of the University of Kingston, Surrey, a fellow of the Royal Television Society, and a governor of the Society of Motion Picture and Television Engineers (SMPTE).

He received the SMPTE highest award, the Progress Medal, in 2006 for his numerous contributions to television technology, and the British Kinematograph, Sound and Television Society has presented him their presidential award in 2000.

Snell, a keen amateur helicopter pilot, co-founded Snelflight in 1998 as designers of indoor model flying machines. Recent models include the world's first jump jet and the world's smallest remote controlled flying novelty.

Snell is the great grandson of the architect Henry Saxon Snell. He married Cecilia Gordon Clark, daughter of Alfred Gordon Clark in 1972; they had three children. Cecilia Gordon Clark died in 1999 and he subsequently married Helen Paul. Snell's second son, Arthur Snell, was British High Commissioner to Trinidad and Tobago from 2011 to 2014.
