= Cyril Hare =

English judge and crime writer

- 1950s Penguin photograph of Hare
- Born: Alfred Alexander Gordon Clark; 4 September 1900; Mickleham, Surrey, England
- Died: 25 August 1958 (aged 57); Westhumble, Surrey, England
- Education: New College, Oxford
- Occupations: County court judge and crime writer
- Spouse: Mary Barbara Lawrence (m. 1933)
- Children: 3, including Alexandra Wedgwood
- Relatives: Martin Wedgwood (son-in-law); Roderick Snell (son-in-law); Arthur Snell (grandson)
- Writing career
- Period: 1937–1958
- Genre: Crime Fiction
- Notable works: Suicide Excepted (1939); Tragedy at Law (1942); An English Murder (1951)
- Literary movement: Golden Age of Detective Fiction

Alfred Alexander Gordon Clark (4 September 1900 – 25 August 1958) was an English barrister, judge and crime writer under the pseudonym Cyril Hare.

== Life and work ==
Gordon Clark was born in Mickleham, Surrey, the third son of Henry Herbert Gordon Clark of Mickleham Hall, Surrey, a merchant in the wine and spirit trade, Matthew Clark & Sons being the family firm. The socialist politician Susan Lawrence was his aunt. He was educated at St Aubyn's, Rottingdean and Rugby. He read History at New College, Oxford (where he heard William Archibald Spooner say in a sermon that 'now we see through a dark glassly' [sic]) and graduated with a First. He then studied law and was called to the Bar at Middle Temple in 1924.

Gordon Clark's pseudonym was a mixture of Hare Court, where he worked in the chambers of Roland Oliver, and Cyril Mansions, Battersea, where he lived after marrying Mary Barbara Lawrence (daughter of Sir William Lawrence, 3rd Baronet) in 1933. They had one son, Charles Philip Gordon Clark (1936-2018; clergyman, later dry stone waller), and two daughters, Alexandra Mary Gordon Clark (b. 1938) and Cecilia Mary Gordon Clark (1944-1999; wife of Roderick Snell).

As a young man and during the early days of the Second World War, Gordon Clark toured as a judge's marshal, an experience he used in Tragedy at Law. Between 1942 and 1945, he worked at the office of the Director of Public Prosecutions. At the beginning of the war, he served a short time at the Ministry of Economic Warfare, and the wartime civil service with many temporary members appears in With a Bare Bodkin. In 1950, he was appointed county court judge in Surrey. His best-known novel is Tragedy at Law, in which he drew on his legal expertise and in which he introduced Francis Pettigrew, a not-very-successful barrister who in this and four other novels just happens to elucidate aspects of the crime. His professional detective (they appeared together in three novels, and only one has neither of them present) was a large and realistic police officer, Inspector Mallett, with a vast appetite.

Tragedy at Law has never been out of print, and Marcel Berlins described it in 1999 as "still among the best whodunnits set in the legal world." P. D. James went further and wrote that it "is generally acknowledged to be the best detective story set in that fascinating world." It appeared at no. 85 in The Top 100 Crime Novels of All Time. Of his other full-length novels, Suicide Excepted shows a man committing an almost perfect murder, only to find that a quirk of the insurance laws deprives him of his hoped-for reward. He was a member of the Detection Club from 1946.

Cyril Hare's short stories were mostly written for the London Evening Standard. Among them, "The Story of Hermione", in which the eponymous character grows rich from the all-too-convenient deaths of several relatives, has been called one of the most chilling short stories ever written. "Sister Bessie" describes vividly the agonies of a blackmail victim and the desperate crimes he commits in the hope of freeing himself from his tormentor. "Miss Burnside's Dilemma" describes the predicament of a person who uncovers a piece of unscrupulous, but entirely legal, chicanery by someone she had previously admired. "A Life for a Life" explores the possibility of atonement for one's earthly sins after death.

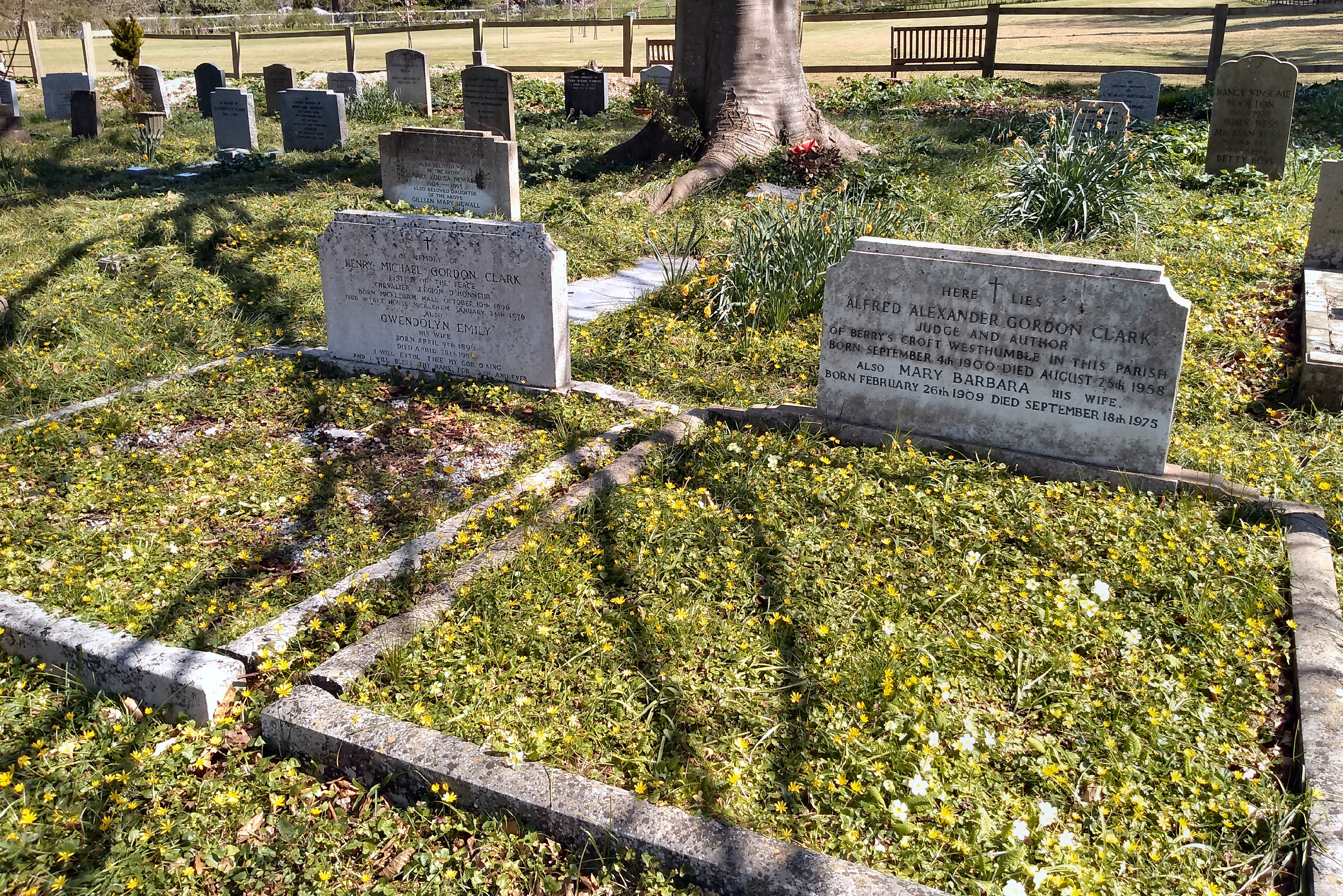
Mickleham, St. Michael's Church

Having contracted tuberculosis shortly after the Second World War, Gordon Clark was never again in full health and died at his home near Box Hill, Surrey at age 57. His estate was valued at £29,106.

He is buried at St. Michael's Church, Mickleham.

== Works ==
=== Novels ===
- The Magic Bottle, a children's book (1946)
- An English Murder (1951), adapted from the radio play Murder at Warbeck Hall (Title of some US reprints The Christmas Murder, 1953)

Inspector Mallett series

- Tenant for Death (1937), adapted from the stage play Murder in Daylesford Gardens
- Death Is No Sportsman (1938)
- Suicide Excepted (1939)

Francis Pettigrew series

- Tragedy at Law (1942) (featuring Inspector Mallett)
- With a Bare Bodkin (1946) (featuring Inspector Mallett)
- When the Wind Blows (US title The Wind Blows Death, 1949)
- That Yew Tree's Shade (US title Death Walks the Woods, 1954)
- He Should Have Died Hereafter (US title and also title of some UK reprints Untimely Death, 1958) (featuring Inspector Mallett)

=== Short story collections ===
- Best Detective Stories of Cyril Hare (US title Death among Friends and Other Stories, 1959, edited by Michael Gilbert)

=== Short stories ===
- The Tragedy of Young Macintyre. Collected in Best Detective Stories of Cyril Hare
- Where There's a Will. Collected in Best Detective Stories of Cyril Hare
- A Life for a Life. Collected in Best Detective Stories of Cyril Hare
- A Very Useful Relationship. Collected in Best Detective Stories of Cyril Hare
- The Death of Amy Robsart. The Sketch, Christmas Number 1937. Collected in Best Detective Stories of Cyril Hare
- Weight and See. Illustrated London News, Christmas Number 1938. Collected in Best Detective Stories of Cyril Hare (Mallett)
- TITLE UNKNOWN. The Sketch, Christmas Number 1938
- Miss Burnside's Mistake. Pearson's Magazine November 1939. Collected in Best Detective Stories of Cyril Hare as Miss Burnside's Dilemma
- The Return Visit. The Gloucester Journal, 6 April 1940 (Mallett)
- It Takes Two.... Evening Standard, 29 November 1949. Collected in Best Detective Stories of Cyril Hare
- Sister Bessie. Evening Standard, 23 December 1949. Collected in Best Detective Stories of Cyril Hare as Sister Bessie or Your Old Leech. Reprinted as Sister Bessie or The Present in the Post. Queensland Times, 28 December 1950
- I Never Forget a Face. Evening Standard, 27 April 1950. Collected in Best Detective Stories of Cyril Hare
- As the Inspector Said.... Evening Standard, 23 August 1950. Collected in Best Detective Stories of Cyril Hare
- The Euthanasia of Hilary's Aunt. Evening Standard, 9 December 1950
- Spare the Rod and Spoil the Crime. Evening Standard, 24 January 1951
- Death among Friends. Evening Standard, 28 March 1951. Collected in Best Detective Stories of Cyril Hare
- Murderers' Luck. This Week, 24 June 1951. Reprinted, Evening Standard, 17 July 1951 and collected in Best Detective Stories of Cyril Hare. Also published as Mugs' Luck and Mug's Luck
- Amazing Lady. This Week, 23 September 1951. Reprinted, Evening Standard, 4 October 1951 and collected in Best Detective Stories of Cyril Hare as The Story of Hermione
- The Will. Evening Standard, 6 December 1951
- Line out of Order. Evening Standard, 4 January 1952. Collected in Best Detective Stories of Cyril Hare. Also published as Automatic Out of Order
- Accident. Evening Standard, 21 June 1952
- Name of Smith. Evening Standard, 5 July 1952. Collected in Best Detective Stories of Cyril Hare (Pettigrew)
- The Old Flame. Evening Standard, 5 August 1952. Collected in Best Detective Stories of Cyril Hare
- Death of a Blackmailer. Evening Standard, 2 September 1952. Collected in Best Detective Stories of Cyril Hare
- A Surprise for Christmas. Evening Standard, 23 December 1952. Collected in Best Detective Stories of Cyril Hare
- The Markhampton Miracle. Evening Standard, 17 October 1953. Collected in Best Detective Stories of Cyril Hare.
- Dropper's Delight. Evening Standard, 13 April 1954. Collected in Best Detective Stories of Cyril Hare
- This Side up with Care. Evening Standard, 8 July 1954
- The Rivals. Evening Standard, 14 July 1955. Collected in Best Detective Stories of Cyril Hare
- The Man in the Silk Pyjamas. Evening Standard, 15 August 1955. Collected in Best Detective Stories of Cyril Hare as The Heel
- The Man from Pannonia. Evening Standard, 30 September 1955
- Punctuality Grant. Evening Standard, 11 October 1955. Also published as The Phone Call at 4am
- The Magnifying Glass. Evening Standard, 10 March 1956
- The Ruling Passion. Evening Standard, 25 July 1956. Collected in Best Detective Stories of Cyril Hare (Pettigrew)
- Devil on the Island. This Week, 17 November 1957. Reprinted, Evening Standard, 9 October 1958 as Thursday's Child. Collected in Best Detective Stories of Cyril Hare
- The Double Take. This Week, 15 December 1957. Reprinted, Evening Standard, 6 October 1958 as Monday's Child. Collected in Best Detective Stories of Cyril Hare
- Sermon's in the Bag. Ellery Queen's Mystery Magazine, August 1958. Reprinted, Evening Standard, 7 October 1958. Collected in Best Detective Stories of Cyril Hare as Tuesday's Child
- Wednesday's Child. Evening Standard, 8 October 1958. Collected in Best Detective Stories of Cyril Hare
- Friday's Child. Evening Standard, 10 October 1958. Collected in Best Detective Stories of Cyril Hare
- Saturday's Child. Evening Standard, 11 October 1958. Collected in Best Detective Stories of Cyril Hare

=== Radio plays ===
- Murder at Warbeck Hall BBC Light Programme, 27 January 1948 (Episode 2 in a series of plays by members of The Detection Club)

=== Stage plays ===
- Murder In Daylesford Gardens (1929). Revised as The Noose Is Cut (1935)
- The House of Warbeck (1955). Adapted from An English Murder

=== Reviews ===
- Forensic Farce (Review of Friends at Court by Henry Cecil). Daily Telegraph, 16 March 1956
