= Andrew Harrison (journalist) =

English music journalist

- Born: 1967 (age 58–59); Liverpool, England
- Occupations: Writer; journalist
- Years active: 1985-present

Andrew Harrison (born 1967) is an English music journalist. In 2008, he coined the term "landfill indie" which VICE described as referring to the "procession of homogenous [guitar] bands" that dominated the UK charts in the mid-2000s.

He has worked as a staff writer for NME, Select, Mixmag, The Word, and Q, and freelance for Rolling Stone, The Face, The Guardian, The Observer and Mojo.

== Early life ==
Harrison was born in Liverpool in 1967 and entered music journalism as a teenager in the mid-1980s, at first publishing live reviews in local press before becoming a staff writer for the NME in the late 1980s and for Select in the early 1990s. He joined The Word in the mid-2000s, which he edited until February 2012, when he left to become editor of Q until April 2013, during a period when print magazines were undergoing double-digit year-on-year decline.

His father, Stan Harrison, was a butcher who owned a premise on Blessington Road, Anfield, Liverpool, where Andrew worked from 1979 until 1984, beginning on a wage of £1 per day. He did not seek to follow his father into the trade, although it did give him a lifelong interest in preparing food. He has three brothers, the youngest of whom, Ian, is news editor of Mojo.

== Career ==
=== 1980s-2000s ===
Harrison began his career covering live gigs for the Liverpool Echo and Daily Post in the mid-1980s. His break came in 1988 when a piece of his was featured in the NME. He wrote for many titles and was editorial director of Mixmag and Smash Hits. He wrote extensively for NME in the late 1980s and early 1990s and interviewed Madonna, U2, Stephen Fry and others while later working freelance for titles such as Rolling Stone, The Guardian, The Observer and GQ.

Harrison is credited with coining the 2008 phrase landfill indie to describe then popular bands such as Snow Patrol, McFly, Razorlight, Maxïmo Park and The Futureheads. The term was later described by the journalist and author Simon Reynolds as "one of the decade's great memes ... it captured that sense of alarming overproduction, the gross excess of supply [of music] over demand. All these bands! Where did they come from? Why did they bother? Couldn't they tell they were shit?"

During 2008, he and Nick DeCosemo co-edited the dance-music monthly Mixmag, which two years earlier had been acquired by David Hepworth's independent publishing company Development Hell from the EMAP group.

=== 2010s-2020s ===
Harrison wrote and published the 2011 book Love Music, Love Food: The Rock Star Cookbook to aid the Teenage Cancer Trust. A coffee-table cook book with photographs by Patrice de Villiers, each dish was selected by rock stars such as Noel Gallagher and Matt Bellamy. Harrison was hired in February 2012 as editor of Q magazine during a period when, according to the Guardian, "print music magazines continue to endure torrid times", and even free titles were failing to compete against blogs and platforms dependent on online advertising. He replaced Paul Rees after the title's circulation was forecast to decline by 17% in the first half of 2012. As Harrison took over editorship, Q readership fell to 64,596 copies; a reduction described by The Guardian as "the worst performance of any music magazine in the period".

Directly reporting to publishing director Rimi Atwal of Q's parent Bauer Media Group, Harrison's brief was to "refocus" and revive the magazine; to that end, he took on a number of new journalists and launched its iPad edition, but decided against rebranding. Under his tenure, the magazine failed to halt sales erosion, although Q was named "Magazine of the Year" at the 2012 "Record of the Day" awards. Nonetheless, he was forced out in April 2013.

He was a contributing editor at Esquire Weekly between September and December 2014. He hosted the podcast "Bigmouth" (2016-2021, with the writer and illustrator Sian Pattenden) and "Remainiacs", subtitled the "no-bullshit Brexit podcast". He continues to publish as a music critic and hosts the "Oh God, What Now?" (a relaunched version of "Remainiacs"), and "The Bunker" podcasts.

== Bibliography ==
- Love Music Love Food: The Rock Star Cookbook: In Support of Teenage Cancer. Quadrille, 2011. ISBN 978-1-8440-0994-7
