= That Yew Tree's Shade =

1954 novel

- First edition
- Author: Cyril Hare
- Language: English
- Series: Francis Pettigrew
- Genre: Detective
- Publisher: Faber and Faber; Little, Brown (US)
- Publication date: 1954
- Publication place: United Kingdom
- Media type: Print
- Preceded by: When the Wind Blows
- Followed by: He Should Have Died Hereafter

That Yew Tree's Shade is a 1954 detective novel by the British writer Cyril Hare. It was the fourth novel in his series featuring Francis Pettigrew, a barrister and amateur detective. It also sees the return from his previous novel When the Wind Blows of the humourless police officer Trimble, now promoted to Superintendent. The novel's setting of a fictional beauty spot in southern England was inspired by Box Hill in the author's native Surrey. The title is taken from a line in Thomas Gray's Elegy. It was first published in London by Faber and Faber and released in the United States by Little, Brown under the alternative title Death Walks the Woods.

== Synopsis ==
England, 1952. Pettigrew and his wife have retired to a cottage she has inherited from an aunt in Yew Hill, a picturesque spot in the county of Markshire. The peace of the area is broken by the Easter tourists who flock there and the murder of Mrs Pink, a kindly local woman who is battered to death on the hill. Potential suspects include a pig farmer, a garage owner and Humphrey Rose, a notorious financial swindler and disgraced politician recently released from prison.

== Bibliography ==
- Murphy, Bruce F. The Encyclopedia of Murder and Mystery. Springer, 1999.
- Reilly, John M. Twentieth Century Crime & Mystery Writers. Springer, 2015.
- Van Dover, J.K. The Detective and the Artist: Painters, Poets and Writers in Crime Fiction, 1840s–1970s. McFarland, 2019.
