= The Queen's Award for Enterprise: Innovation (Technology) (2007) =

The Queen's Award for Enterprise: Innovation (Technology) (2007) was awarded on 21 April 2007, by Queen Elizabeth II.

== Recipients ==
The following organisations were awarded this year.

- Air Products PLC, Packaged Gases Group of Basingstoke, Hampshire for Integra-Maxx gases and cylinders for welding and cutting.
- Aquapac International Limited of London SE24 for design, manufacture and marketing of waterproof protective cases.
- Autoflame Engineering Ltd of London SE6 for the Mk6 Evolution MM Combustion Management System.
- BMP Europe Ltd of Altham, Accrington, for paper transport rollers for high speed digital printers.
- Baxi Heating UK Ltd (t/a Andrews Water Heaters) of Wednesbury, West Midlands for 'MAXXflo' direct fired high-efficiency condensing stainless steel storage water heater.
- The Binding Site Ltd of Birmingham, for novel blood test for bone marrow cancer.
- West Midlands CSR PLC of Cambridge, BlueCore – system-on-chip solutions for bluetooth applications.
- Care Monitoring 2000 Ltd of Sutton Coldfield, West Midlands for CallConfirmLive!, an IT based monitoring and management service for home care.
- Charity Financial Services of West Malling, Kent for charitable/financial services to the voluntary sector focusing on small and medium-sized charities.
- De La Rue Currency of Basingstoke, Hampshire for StarChrome wide windowed optically variable banknote security thread.
- EA Technology Limited of Capenhurst, Chester for the UltraTEV Detector Partial for discharge instrument for monitoring high voltage equipment.
- Enterprise Control Systems Ltd of Towcester, Encrypted for COFDM digital video transmission systems.
- FlavorActiV Limited of Chinnor, Oxfordshire for Taster Validation for scheme to assess and track beer tasters' competencies within breweries.
- Fortress Interlocks Limited of Wolverhampton, West Midlands for design of 'mGard', a mechanical safety interlocking product.
- Freeman Technology Ltd of Malvern, Worcestershire for fT4 powder rheometer for measuring the flow properties of powders.
- James Halstead plc of Radcliffe, Manchester for commercial safety flooring, branded 'Polysafe'.
- Hickman Industries Ltd of Wolverhampton, for timber system building products.
- West Midlands i-level Ltd of London SW1 for i-level – changing from a media agency to a commercial agency.
- International Paint Ltd (Marine Division) of Gateshead, Tyne and Wear for 'Intersleek 700' fouling control coating for use on hulls and propellers of scheduled ships.
- K2 Medical Systems of Plymouth, Devon for products for improving maternity care.
- Medi Travelcover Ltd (t/a InsureCancer) of Farnham, Surrey for pioneering insurance underwriting innovation for those affected by cancer.
- Molecular Profiles Ltd of Nottingham for contract analysis and research services to pharmaceutical and biomedical companies.
- Motorola Point to Point Fixed Wireless Solutions Group of Ashburton, Devon for wireless point to point transmission equipment delivering broadband.
- IP OPRO Ltd of Hatfield, Hertfordshire for custom fitted mouthguards allowing for future growth patterns and orthodontics.
- Optical Metrology Services Limited of Bishop's Stortford, Hertfordshire for Pipe Checker- for accurate laser dimensional measurement of oil, gas and water pipes.
- Oxford Instruments Nanoanalysis of High Wycombe, Buckinghamshire for 'INCADryCool' radical innovation in cooling technology for high performance x-ray detectors.
- PCME Ltd of St Ives, Cambridgeshire for innovation in the design and distribution of particle emission instrumentation.
- QRG Limited (t/a Quantum Research Group) of Southampton, Hampshire for electronic touch sensor chips and technology licensing for control surfaces of consumer electronic products.
- Renishaw plc of Wotton-under-Edge, RMP60 and for rMI spindle probe system.
- Rockfield Software Limited of Swansea, Wales for elfen-FEM/DEM computational system for simulation of multi-fracturing solids.
- Rofin-Sinar UK Ltd of Hull, SCx60 sealed diffusion cooled RF excited for cO2 laser.
- Shackerley (Holdings) Group Limited of Chorley, Lancashire for sureclad aluminium sub-structure for fixing ceramic granite slabs.
- Snell & Wilcox Ltd of Havant, Hampshire Kahuna Multiformat for sD/HD production switcher.
- Solagen Limited of Thornbury, Bristol for solar powered highway safety products.
- Tacktick Ltd of Emsworth, for Hampshire 'Micronet' wireless marine electronics.
- Taylor Bloxham Limited of Leicester, recently entered into administration, for paint colour cards using the lithographic printing process.
- Title Research Group Ltd (now known as findmypast) of London EC1 for provision of public internet access to official genealogy records.
- UPM Machinery Sales Ltd of Langley, Slough, for removal of moisture from hygroscopic materials.
- Ultra Electronics of Weymouth, Dorset for the Alto family of low cost colour ID card printers for manufacturing and card systems, portrait identity card and badge printing.
- School of Pharmacy, The University of Nottingham of Nottingham for pharmaceutical applications of nanotechnology.
