= Ian Dunt =

British author and political journalist

- Born: 4 February 1982 (age 44) Winchester, England
- Occupation: Political journalist, Broadcaster
- Education: University College London (BA); University of Warwick (MA); London School of Journalism (Diploma)
- Years active: 2008–present

Ian Dunt (born 4 February 1982) is a British author, political journalist, and broadcaster. He currently writes as a columnist for The i Paper. He previously served for many years as the Editor of politics.co.uk. He was also a host on the Remainiacs podcast. He currently hosts the Origin Story podcast with Dorian Lynskey and is a regular contributor to Late Night Live on ABC Radio National.

== Early life ==
Dunt was born in Winchester and grew up in Chile and the UK (Winchester and Southampton). He went to The Pilgrims' School, a prep school in Winchester. He holds a Bachelor's degree in Philosophy (2004) from University College London, a Master's in International Relations (2006) from University of Warwick and a Diploma in Journalism and Media Law (2008) from the London School of Journalism.

== Career ==
Dunt began his career as a journalist for PinkNews. He then switched to political analysis for Yahoo!, before becoming Political Editor of Erotic Review, a position he held until January 2010, when he became editor of Politics.co.uk. He regularly appears on TV, commenting on political developments in the United Kingdom.

In May 2017, Dunt was part of the team that launched Remainiacs, a political podcast about Britain's departure from the European Union, as seen from a pro-Remain perspective. In January 2020 the same team launched The Bunker, a podcast similar in format that discusses political issues other than Brexit. In October 2020, Remainiacs was renamed Oh God, What Now? In 2025, he was appointed editorial board chair for the 140-year-old rationalist magazine, New Humanist.

== Bibliography ==
- Brexit: What the Hell Happens Now? (2016) Canbury Press
- How To Be A Liberal (September 2020) Canbury Press
- How Westminster Works ... and Why It Doesn't (April 2023) Orion
