= Politics.co.uk =

News and feature British website

- Politics.co.uk homepage screenshot, 9 July 2022
- Website type: News website
- Founded: 2002
- Owner: Senate Media
- Editor: Josh Self
- Website: www.politics.co.uk

Politics.co.uk is a news and feature website focusing on British politics. For almost a decade up until the summer of 2021, the site was edited by the political journalist Ian Dunt. The current editor of the publication is Josh Self. Adam Bienkov, the political editor at Byline Times, was previously the deputy editor of Politics.co.uk.

== History ==
Politics.co.uk has been covering British politics for over twenty years since it was first established in 2002, and is owned by the digital publishing company Senate Media.

In an interview with Politics.co.uk during the 2010 United Kingdom general election, the then prime minister Gordon Brown appeared to support tactical voting in that year's general election. He said: "I want everyone to vote Labour. But if people don't want a Conservative government then they must make sure they don't let the Conservatives in."

In 2013, Godfrey Bloom, the then UK Independence Party (UKIP) member of the European Parliament, attracted controversy after writing an opinion article on Politics.co.uk. Shortly after his 2,000 word article, Bloom lost the UKIP whip. He had stated that women were more suited to finding "mustard in the pantry" than driving cars.

== Political outlook ==
Politics.co.uk states that it is politically independent. In 2017, Dunt wrote the book Brexit: What The Hell Happens Now?
