= Quantel Mirage =

Digital real-time video effects processor manufactured by Quantel

The Quantel Mirage, or DVM8000/1 "Digital Video Manipulator", was a real-time digital video effects processor introduced by Quantel in 1982. It was capable of warping a live video stream by texture mapping it onto an arbitrary three-dimensional shape, around which the viewer could freely rotate or zoom in real-time. It could also interpolate, or morph, between two different shapes. It was considered the first real-time 3D video effects processor.

== Features ==
The Mirage was programmable - new shapes could be created by writing programs in the Pascal programming language on an attached Hewlett-Packard computer. This made the device extremely flexible, but such programming was difficult and it became a highly specialized skill known by few. The programming of the HP mini computer was so complex that only basic canned effects would be practically used by video editors in productions.

Physically, the Mirage was a large device whose processing equipment filled a full-height 19-inch rack, weighed 400 kilograms and consumed over 4 kilowatts of electrical power.

The Quantel Mirage did never-before seen effects, but required heavy math/geometrical programming via the HP computer to define the basic shapes that real-time video would be mapped onto. One of the effects shown on the National Association of Broadcasters trade-show floor to introduce the Mirage was a flattened Coke soft-drink can on video. The Mirage in real-time re-assembled the can on a tube, then allowed you to tumble or travel within it while it rotated with partial transparency - allowing you to see the Coke logo in reverse on the opposite side of the can as it would turn.

== Notable uses ==
One famous Mirage user was Mike Oldfield, who purchased one for his extensive home music studio and video production facility. Signature Mirage effects can be seen in the Wind Chimes video album, in the form of rotating spiky spheres and granulated morphing effects.

A common spinning globe effect can be seen on the opening of USA for Africa's "We Are The World," and the Cyndi Lauper's "Girls Just Wanna Have Fun" music videos.
