= Snell & Wilcox Zone Plate =

TV test pattern

Snell & Wilcox SW2 and SW4 "Zone Plate" Test Chart (also referred to as Snell & Wilcox Test Pattern) were TV test cards introduced in the 1990s and used with NTSC, PAL and SDTV systems.

Popular versions of the test charts were made available on Laserdisc and DVD-Video, allowing home users and professionals to test and calibrate their equipment. Several broadcast widescreen variations exist.

They were created using equipment like the Snell & Wilcox TPG20/21 Test Pattern Generators.

== Features ==
The Snell & Wilcox Test Chart #2 (or SW2) is used for general adjustments of video processors, mixing equipment, and display devices such as CRT TVs and projectors. Main features and tests allowed by the chart are:

- Boundary markers (arrows for overscan check)
- Interlace check (black box with oblique white line)
- Tartan bars (75% luminance color bars, with a grayscale bar—20, 40, 60 and 80%—below)
- Circular grayscale (to check for dither or quantization problems)
- Chart format
- Registration check (for color alignment check)
- Vertical frequency response check (boxes with 100, 200 and 300 TV lines)
- Horizontal and Diagonal frequency response check (boxes with 3.58 MHz NTSC vertical bars, 300 TV lines vertical and diagonal, 400 TV lines vertical and diagonal, and 4.43 MHz PAL vertical bars)
- SECAM bell filter check (4.286 MHz SECAM burst)
- Frequency response wedge (1.5 to 5.5 MHz wedge)
- Radial wedge (up to 450 TV lines)
- Moving zone plate (up to 429 TV lines)
- Chroma frequency response
- Y/C timing checks
- PLUGE
- Pulse and Bar
- Chroma non-linearity
- Chroma tests (large area red box, 100% brightness)

== See also ==
- Philips circle pattern
- Telefunken FuBK
- Snell & Wilcox
