= An English Murder =

1951 crime novel by Cyril Hare

- First edition
- Author: Cyril Hare
- Cover artist: Edward Ardizzone
- Language: English
- Genre: Crime mystery
- Published: 1951
- Publisher: Faber & Faber

An English Murder is a crime novel by Cyril Hare. Published in 1951, it combines traits of classical Golden Age murder mystery – a group of guests in a snowed in country house – with the realities of post-war Britain.

The book was republished in 2017, with both Mark Lawson in The Guardian and Marcel Berlins in The Sunday Times listing it as one of the best crime novels of the year. In 2019 The Guardian included the novel in the list of Top 10 golden age detective novels.

== List of characters ==
- Viscount Warbeck, an old and gravely ill peer.
- Robert Warbeck, the Viscount's only son.
- Sir Julius Warbeck, a first cousin of the Viscount, who is a socialist M.P. and current Chancellor of the Exchequer.
- Mrs Carstairs, a daughter of the former rector of the parish and wife of Alan Carstairs, who is a colleague of Sir Julius and his likely successor as Chancellor of the Exchequer.
- Lady Camilla Prendergast, counted as a member of the family.
- James Rogers, sergeant in the Metropolitan Police, assigned as personal guard to Sir Julius.
- Briggs, the butler at Warbeck Hall.
- Susan, Briggs's daughter.
- Wenceslaus Bottwink, Ph.D., Professor of History. Born in Hungary, having Jewish and Russian blood in his make-up, he was a citizen of Austria, then Czechoslovakia, then Germany and after a Nazi concentration camp found sanctuary in England.

== Plot ==
After dinner, Robert Warbeck, the only son and heir of the bedridden Viscount, dies in front of the other guests. Because of heavy snowfall, Warbeck Hall is cut off from the outer world and the phone line is broken. The guests accept Sergeant Rogers as investigator. When told the next morning, the old Viscount dies of shock. Still cut off, another guest dies, this time it is Mrs Carstairs. Both Robert Warbeck and Mrs Carstairs seem to have been poisoned. Doctor Bottwink, who was originally invited to study centuries-old documents in the family library, works out who was the murderer.

== Political and social context ==
The novel was published in 1951, six years after the end of the Second World War, from which Great Britain came as one of the victors. Nevertheless, its position as a superpower became increasingly shaky as it was losing colonies and influence in world politics. In 1945 general election, the Labour Party secured an unexpected landslide victory, and was re-elected in 1950 albeit with a much-reduced majority. The left-leaning government enacted much of the post-war consensus policies, especially the welfare state and nationalisation of some industries; it was marked by post-war austerity measures, in giving independence to India, in partitioning Palestine and forming Israel, and engagement in the Cold War against Soviet Union.

Reflecting changes in the convoluted marriage of democratic and royal laws and customs of Great Britain, the novel has an underlying theme of social transformation. The ailing and death of old Lord Warbeck are a symbol of old order and traditions disappearing. He is sorry for his son, Robert, who "have had the misfortune to be born into the first generation of the dispossessed". Robert Warbeck, opposing the new course of the Labour government that "has gone about to destroy tradition — to destroy us — to destroy our country", has organized a fascist League of Liberty and Justice, an antisemitic and anti-socialist organization. Robert cannot contain his political leanings even when talking to Lady Camilla, finding fault with Doctor Bottwink, "Has your new Jew friend asked you to go back to Palestine with him yet?"

Doctor Bottwink, a well-educated Jew from Eastern Europe, who managed to escape Nazi concentration camp, is sympathetic to Communist ideas but despises Soviet Stalinism. Sergeant Rogers inquires Doctor Bottwink whether the Doctor was in Vienna during Dolfuss régime, and Doctor Bottwink clarifies that he was anti-Dolfuss, anti-clerical, and anti-Fascist.

Sir Julius identifies himself as socialist despite being a first cousin of Lord Warbeck. He occupies the position of Chancellor of the Exchequer in "the most advanced socialist government of Western Europe". He considers post-war Great Britain a world where "the owners of historic mansions are pitiable anachronisms, helplessly awaiting the hour when the advancing tread of social justice would force them from the privileged positions they had too long usurped". When Sir Julius thinks back about the murders that occurred in Warbeck Hall, he comes to a conclusion that it was him who was targeted, and only by chance he was spared. "Who are the real enemies of communism today? Why, we are — the democratic socialists of Western Europe!" exclaims Sir Julius, blaming Doctor Bottwink in the murders.

As an example of re-evaluation of British foreign endeavours, Sir Julius and Mrs. Carstairs clash over a Chinese gong, used by Briggs to signal for meal. "I remember my father telling me it came from the loot of the Winter Palace at Pekin. Great days! Great days!" observes Sir Julius. "Surely, Sir Julius, you don't suggest that the sack of the Winter Palace was a creditable episode in our history?" breaks in Mrs. Carstairs, and the acrid discussion proceeds on the events surrounding the Boxer revolt of 1900.

Reissued at the time when Brexit became a reality and the Labour Party led by Jeremy Corbyn achieved the biggest percentage-point increase in its vote share since 1945, the novel regains its relevance amid the contentions of 21st century politics.

== Adaptations ==
=== Film ===
A Very English Murder (1974)

The novel was made into a 1974 movie directed by Samson Samsonov at Mosfilm studio in the Soviet Union. Overall, the film closely follows the novel. The introduction is compressed with all guests arriving by car. The excursion undertaken by Sir Julius to a nearby village (Chapter XIV in the novel) did not make it to the film.
