= Snell Limited =

British video equipment manufacturer

Snell Advanced Media (Snell Ltd)
- Company type: Limited
- Traded as: Snell Advanced Media
- Industry: Digital Media Production
- Predecessor: Quantel Ltd
- Founded: 1973 (as Snell & Wilcox); 2009 (merger)
- Founder: Roderick Snell
- Defunct: 2018
- Successor: Grass Valley
- Headquarters: Newbury, United Kingdom
- Key people: Tim Thorsteinson
- Products: Digital production equipment
- Number of employees: 550
- Website: s-a-m.com

Snell Limited, branded as Snell Advanced Media or SAM, was a British company that designed and developed solutions for the media production market including applications for central operations, live production, post production, playout and media management. They were headquartered in Newbury, UK.

SAM delivers agile technology across Live Production, Production, Editing & Finishing, Playout & Delivery, Infrastructure & Image Processing, all running under enterprise-wide Management & Workflow automation.

Snell Limited, owned by bankers LDC, was created from the merger of Snell & Wilcox and Pro-Bel in 2009. In March 2014 Snell was acquired by another company owned by LDC, Quantel Ltd. After LDC's replacement of Snell CEO Simon Derry with Quantel CEO Ray Cross, the process of merging the companies began. LDC had previously in 2006 appointed Cross to replace Quantel CEO Richard Taylor. However within a year LDC then replaced Cross with new CEO Tim Thorsteinson. The company was rebranded as Snell Advanced Media in September 2015. After the rebrand, SAM continued to carry the Quantel name on its Quantel Rio, formerly Pablo Rio, line of post-production solutions.

== History ==
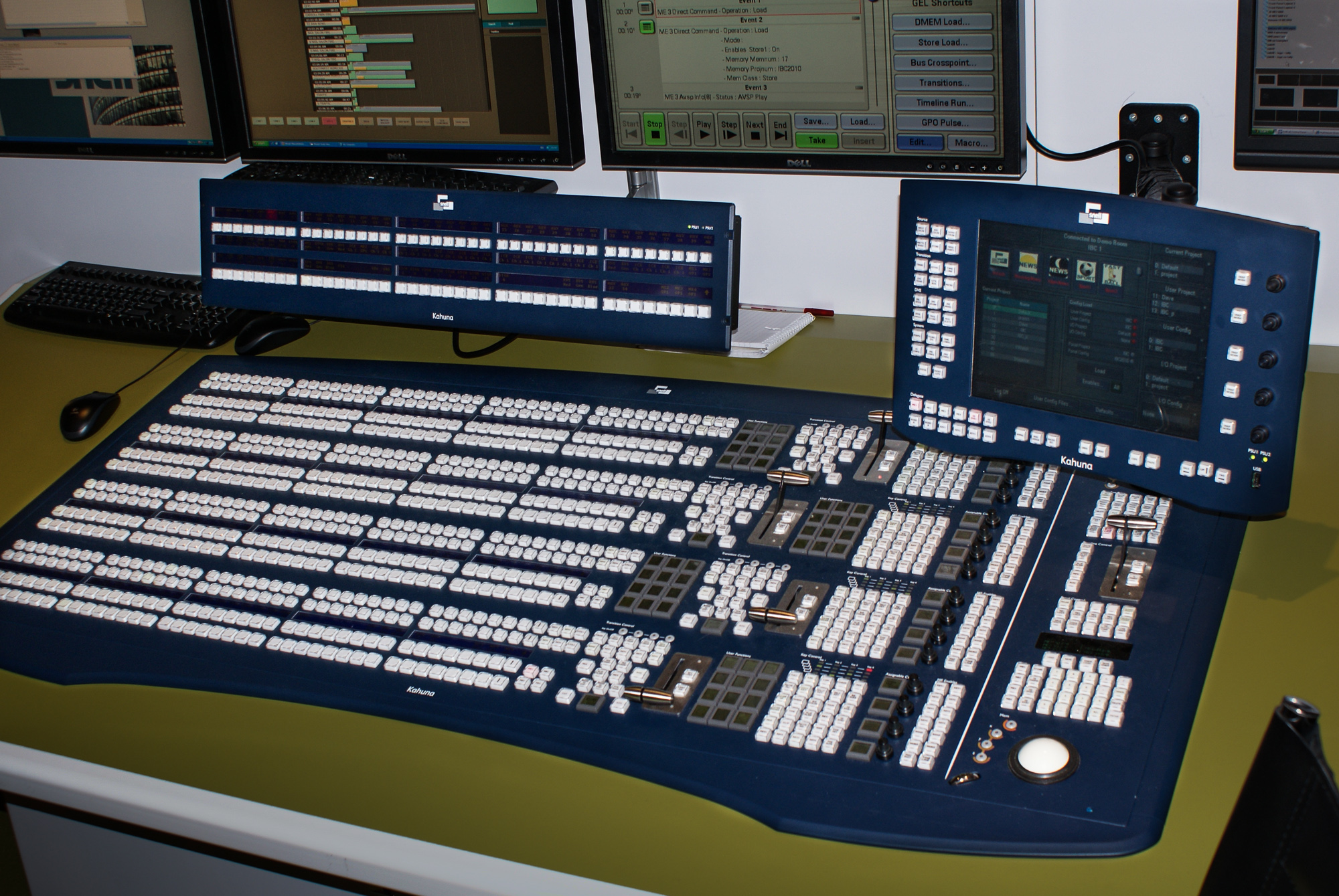
Snell Kahuna vision mixer

Snell & Wilcox was founded by engineer Roderick Snell in 1973.

Around the turn of the 21st century, Snell & Wilcox created the SW2 and SW4 "Zone Plate" test cards for use with their TPG20 and TPG21 test pattern generators.

In 2007 Snell and Wilcox Ltd. was awarded the Queens Award for Technological Innovation for the Kahuna Multiformat SD/HD production switcher.

In April 2009 Snell & Wilcox merged with Pro-Bel. The company took the name Snell. In March 2014 it was announced that Snell had been acquired by Quantel.

After the departure of Quantel CEO Ray Cross and Tim Thorsteinson was appointed CEO in February 2015. Thorsteinson held senior roles in the media technology industry; he has twice been the CEO of Grass Valley, President of the Broadcast Communications division of Harris Corp., and President and CEO of Enablence. The company was rebranded as Snell Advanced Media in September 2015.

In June 2017 it was announced that Thorsteinson was stepping down as CEO and being replaced by Eric Cooney On 8 February 2018, it was announced that Belden had acquired SAM and the company was to be absorbed into the Grass Valley umbrella.
