= Peter Michael (engineer) =

British engineer and businessman (born 1938)

Sir Peter Colin Michael CBE (born 17 June 1938) is a British engineer and businessman whose interests include radio and wine-making.

Peter Michael grew up in Croydon, the son of Albert and Enid Michael. His father was the chairman of the London philatelic shop Stanley Gibbons. He was educated at Whitgift School.

== Business career ==
After training as an engineer at Queen Mary University of London, he worked at Smith Industries and Plessey, before leaving in 1968 to set up his first company.

He founded and managed a range of technology companies including Micro Consultants Group, UEI plc, Cosworth Engineering and Quantel.

In 1983, he founded the Peter Michael Winery in the Knights Valley region of Calistoga, northern California. From 1989 to 1992 he served as CEO of Cray UK. In 1992 Sir Peter founded Classic FM.

== Personal life ==
Michael was knighted in the 1989 Birthday Honours.

His wife Margaret (Lady Michael) farms 1000 acres in Berkshire with arable cereals and a pedigree South Devon Red breeding herd.

Peter has set up two charitable foundations dedicated to fighting prostate cancer, the Pelican Cancer Foundation (UK) and the Peter Michael Foundation (US).

He also served as Vice-Patron of the Royal Society of British Sculptors.
