= Gráinne Maguire =

Irish stand-up comedian and writer

Gráinne Maguire is an Irish stand-up comedian, writer and podcaster.

== Early career ==
Maguire was a finalist in the 2007 Laughing Horse new act competition and a finalist in the 2008 Funny Women competition.

== Career ==
At the Edinburgh Festival Fringe in 2016 Maguire had a show entitled Great people making great choices. On the 2017 Edinburgh Fringe Maguire had her one woman show Gráinne with a Fada, as well as a panel show on at the Cabaret Voltaire entitled What Has The News Ever Done For Me? Maguire returned to the Edinburgh Fringe in 2018 performing at the Gilded Balloon with her show I forgive you, please like me.

Gráinne Maguire has appeared on BBC Radio 4 satirical comedy The Now Show, More Money Than Sense and Breaking The News as well as Stewart Lee’s The Alternative Comedy Experience.

Maguire has been a writer for comedy shows The News Quiz, Newsjack and Dead Ringers on BBC Radio 4 as well as television shows The Last Leg and 8 out of 10 Cats for Channel 4. Maguire has also written columns for The Guardian.

Maguire has been a panellist on the BBC 1 flagship debate show Question Time. Maguire has been a guest on BBC 2 programme Daily Politics, and BBC current affairs investigative programme Panorama. In 2018, with Marie Le Conte, Maguire produced 20 episodes of a podcast called Changing Politics. The podcast was funded by the think-tank Labour Together, and some of its content was scripted by its director Morgan McSweeney.

In March 2026, Maguire was confirmed to be part of the writing team for the first series of Saturday Night Live UK.

== Personal life ==
Maguire was born in Ireland but now lives in London. A former Labour supporter, she opened at the Labour Party Conference for then leader Ed Miliband. In 2016 Maguire used Twitter to live-tweet her menstrual cycle to Taoiseach Enda Kenny in protest at Ireland’s abortion laws, the coverage of which appeared major international newspapers, and Maguire was interviewed on BBC Worldwide, and BBC World Service. Maguire has spoken of her respect for Michelle Obama.
