= Tragedy at Law =

1942 novel

- Author: Cyril Hare
- Language: English
- Series: Francis Pettigrew; Inspector Mallett
- Genre: Detective
- Publisher: Faber and Faber
- Publication date: 1942
- Publication place: United Kingdom
- Media type: Print
- Followed by: With a Bare Bodkin

Tragedy at Law is a 1942 mystery detective novel by the British author Cyril Hare. It is the first of five novels featuring the lawyer Francis Pettigrew, an amateur detective. It also features Inspector Mallet of Scotland Yard who had appeared in three previous novels by Hare and would return in two further Pettigrew novels. It takes place over a period of several months from September 1939, shortly after the outbreak of the Second World War, to April 1940. It has been considered as Hare's finest book.

== Bibliography ==
- Hubin, Allen J. Crime Fiction, 1749-1980: A Comprehensive Bibliography. Garland Publishing, 1984.
- Herbert, Rosemary. Whodunit?: A Who's Who in Crime & Mystery Writing. Oxford University Press, 2003.
- Magill, Frank Northen. Critical Survey of Mystery and Detective Fiction: Authors, Volume 1. Salem Press, 1988.
- Reilly, John M. Twentieth Century Crime & Mystery Writers. Springer, 2015.
- Sauerberg, Lars Ole. The Legal Thriller from Gardner to Grisham: See you in Court!. Springer, 2016.
