= When the Wind Blows (Hare novel) =

1949 novel

- UK first edition
- Author: Cyril Hare
- Language: English
- Series: Francis Pettigrew
- Genre: Detective
- Publisher: Faber and Faber; Little, Brown (US)
- Publication date: 1949
- Publication place: United Kingdom
- Media type: Print
- Preceded by: With a Bare Bodkin
- Followed by: That Yew Tree's Shade

When the Wind Blows is a 1949 detective novel by the British author Cyril Hare. It is the third in his series of five novels featuring the amateur detective Francis Pettigrew, a barrister. It was first published in London by Faber and Faber and released in the United States by Little, Brown under the alternative title The Wind Blows Death.

== Synopsis ==
Recently married, Pettigrew has taken up practice in the cathedral city of the English county of Markshire. Reluctantly appointed the treasurer for the Markshire Orchestral Society, due to his wife's interest in music, he is present at a concert when the celebrated visiting violinist Lucy Carless is strangled to death backstage during the performance. While the dogged Inspector Trimble of the county police force pursues the various clues and dead ends of all those connected with the orchestra, Pettigrew is secretly invited by the Chief Constable to assist with the investigation. The solution appears to lie in the woodwind section of the orchestra.

== Bibliography ==
- Murphy, Bruce F. The Encyclopedia of Murder and Mystery. Springer, 1999.
- Reilly, John M. Twentieth Century Crime & Mystery Writers. Springer, 2015.
- Van Dover, J.K. The Detective and the Artist: Painters, Poets and Writers in Crime Fiction, 1840s–1970s. McFarland, 2019.
