= Arthur Snell =

British businessman, political commentator and diplomat (born 1975)

- Born: 30 October 1975 (age 51)
- Education: University of Oxford
- Occupations: Political commentator Author
- Known for: Former British High Commissioner for Trinidad & Tobago

Arthur Snell (born 30 October 1975) is a British author, political commentator, and former diplomat who served as the United Kingdom's High Commissioner to Trinidad and Tobago from 2011 to 2014. His father is electronics engineer Roderick Snell.

== Biography ==
Snell was born on 30 October 1975, in South East England and attended Bedales School, later graduating from the University of Oxford in History. Following work at the Foreign and Commonwealth Office in London, he held several diplomatic postings in Zimbabwe, Nigeria, Yemen, Iraq and Afghanistan. He was appointed the United Kingdom's High Commissioner to Trinidad and Tobago in 2010 and assumed his post in June 2011.

He has also headed the Foreign Office contribution to the UK's "Prevent" anti-terrorism programme. Snell later left government service and is managing director of Orbis Business Intelligence, a risk consultancy, where one of his fellow directors is former MI6 officer, Christopher Steele who compiled the Steele Dossier on Donald Trump.

In 2020, Snell contributed to a report commissioned by Andrew Duncan, a Scottish-American film producer, which looked at attempts to influence UK elites by China, which was also contributed to by Christopher Steele.

Since January 2020, Snell has been a regular contributor and host to the political podcast The Bunker, which a spinoff of the podcast "Oh God, What Now?". Later in November 2021, he started his own geopolitical podcast, called Doomsday Watch talking to experts about geopolitical issues. As the series completed, he later continued the Doomsday podcast in another series on the back of Russia's invasion of Ukraine, speaking with experts about conflict.

In July 2022, he published his first book "How Britain Broke the World". In March 2026, he published "Elemental - The New Geography of Climate Change and How We Survive It".

In 2025 Michael Crick revealed that Snell had tried to be selected as the Liberal Democrat candidate for North Cotswolds.
