= Quantel =

British video equipment manufacturer

- Type: Limited
- Industry: Broadcast television, video production and motion picture
- Founded: 1973; 53 years ago
- Founders: Peter Michael, Arthur Graves, Anthony Stalley, John Coffey
- Defunct: 2015
- Fate: Rebranded as Snell Advanced Media following consolidation
- Successor: Snell Ltd.
- Headquarters: Newbury, Berkshire, England, United Kingdom
- Key people: Richard Taylor OBE (former chairman), Paul Kellar MBE (former research director)
- Products: Digital production equipment
- Number of employees: 1,000 plus (1995) approx 250 (2014)
- Website: www.quantel.com

Quantel was a company based in the United Kingdom and founded in 1973 that designed and manufactured digital production equipment for the broadcast television, video production and motion picture industries. It was headquartered in Newbury, Berkshire. The name Quantel came from Quantised Television, in reference to the process of converting a television picture into a digital signal.

Quantel acquired Snell Limited in March 2014. Following a period of consolidation the two companies started operating under the Snell name, trading as Snell Advanced Media or SAM, from September 2015, following the staged removal of the Quantel board of directors by incoming CEO Ray Cross.

Quantel was purchased by Grass Valley, who were taken over by Cayman Island-registered Black Dragon Capital in 2020 who decided to close down Newbury factory in 2023, the 50th anniversary year of Quantel.

Around 50 legacy Quantel machines are known to still exist in museums and private collections around the world, several of which have been restored to working order by enthusiasts.

== History ==
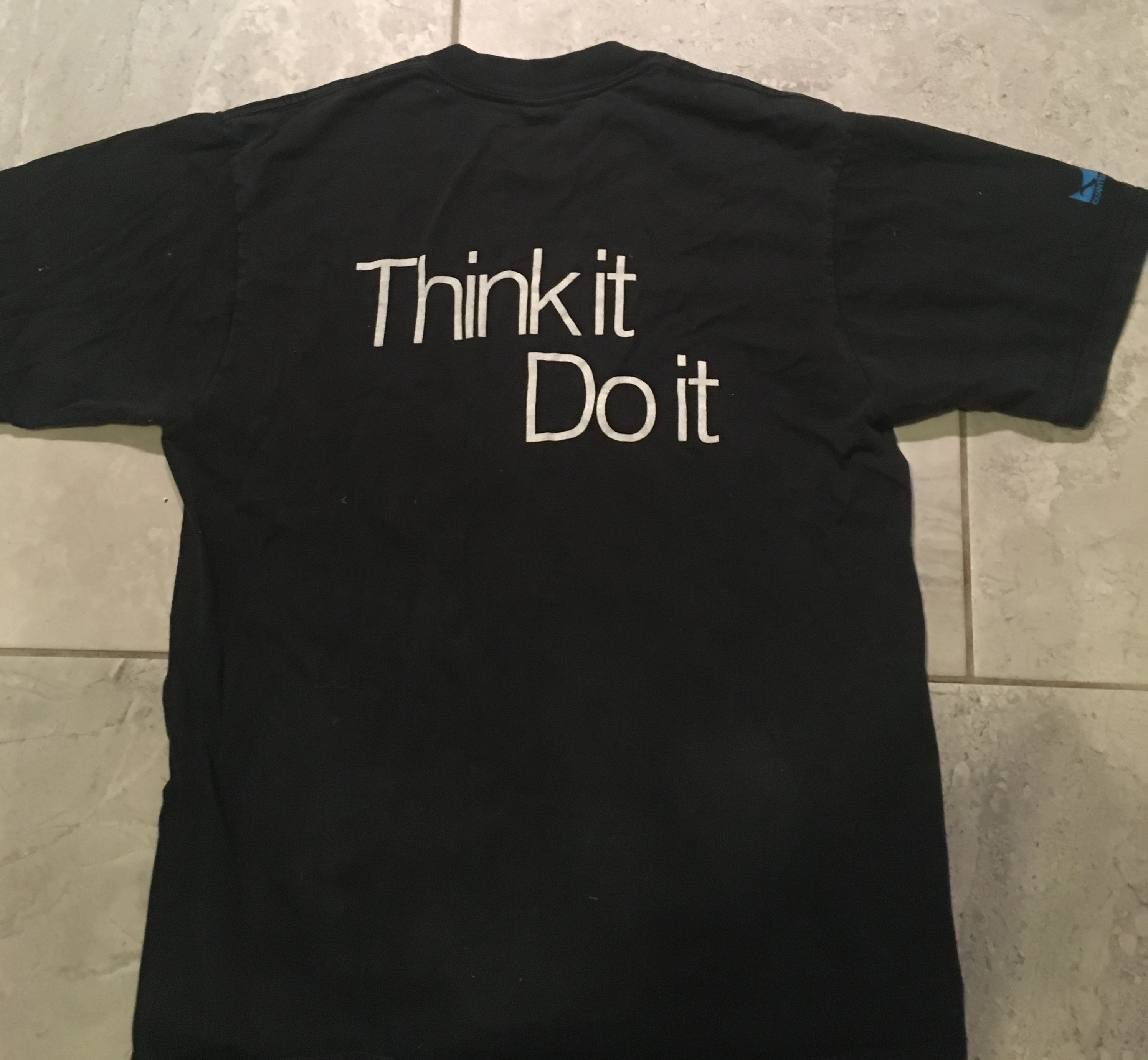
The Henry 'Think it Do it' campaign showcased work on Madonna, Ramones and Smashing Pumpkins music videos

Quantel founder, Peter Michael, had previously founded Micro Consultants Group (MCG). MCG had pioneered a range of fast data conversion products that could be used for converting video signals from analog to digital and back to analog. These devices found use in many early Quantel products.

In the 1980s, Michael merged Quantel along with his other interests such as Link Electronics Ltd into the UEI Group of companies.

Michael became chairman with Quantel remaining a privately owned company of the publicly quoted UEI. Under the leadership of Richard Taylor OBE, chairman from 1975 and Paul Kellar MBE, Quantel made several pioneering firsts in video:

- In 1975, it released the first all-digital framestore, the Quantel DFS 3000. It was first introduced in TV coverage of the 1976 Montreal Olympics to generate a picture-in-picture inset of the Olympics' flaming torch while the rest of the picture featured the runner entering the stadium. Framestore technology provided the cornerstone for the future development of digital television products.
- In 1981, it released the Paintbox, an extremely advanced television graphics system for its time. Paintboxes are still in use today due to their image quality and versatility. The Weather Channel was the first customer in the United States to purchase a Paintbox in 1982 (they had serial number '1' in the USA), which was used to generate its on-air weather maps during their first years of operation. MTV was another early customer of the Paintbox.
- When the BBC weather department decided to move from magnetic weather symbols on a board in 1985 to a complete digital solution, it used modified Paintboxes which were controlled via Apple Lisa computers. The weather presenter then stood in front of a blue screen holding a button that was connected to the Lisa, which then in turn communicated with the Paintbox to bring up the next slide.
- In 1985, Quantel released the "Harry" effects compositing system/non-linear editor. The Harry was designed to edit in real time and render special effects in non-real time using the video recorded on its built-in hard disk array (much like most computer based non-linear editing systems today). The hard disk array used drives made by Fujitsu, and were connected to the Harry using a proprietary parallel interface, much like a modern-day RAID array. Technically, it was the first all-digital non-linear editing system. Due to technical constraints of the time, the Harry could only record 80 seconds of video, albeit encoded in full broadcast-quality, uncompressed D1-style 8-bit CCIR 601 format. This aside, the Harry was quite an advanced machine, and the only system like it for its time.
- In 1992, Quantel released "Henry", the first multilayer compositing system, which became the worldwide industry standard for commercials production, and went on to win the British government's Queen's Award for Export Achievement, Quantel's ninth such award.

This period until 1998 marked the high point of the company's profitability, size and market position, placing it in the top handful of broadcast vendors. The company had a global presence with major offices, staff, and facilities on the east and west coast of the US; in Paris, Tokyo, London, Seoul, Hong Kong and Sydney; plus other overseas resources. There was a private air operation (Quantel Aviation) based in Farnborough, which included a private Cessna Citation executive jet. However, as software-based products began to gain ground in Quantel's then core businesses of compositing, graphics. and news editing, the company was not able to maintain this position.

=== Recent history ===
In 1989 Quantel had been acquired from UEI by Carlton Communications which had also acquired high end sound console manufacturer Solid State Logic as part of the same deal. This relationship ended in 2000 when Quantel management bought the company back for $76.6m funded by Lloyds Banking Group venture capital arm LDC.

From 2000 to 2005, Quantel then specialised in:

- sQ - Video server based system for the broadcast industry which is designed for all forms of fast turnaround production, such as sports and news
- Newsbox - Complete news production system in a box
- iQ - Used for digital intermediate film work
- eQ - Used for post-production and TV commercial work
- Pablo - Color grading system
- Mission - A media and asset management system for handling media in large systems

December 2005 saw the forced departure from the board of long-standing chairman and chief executive Richard Taylor OBE by owners LDC in conjunction with Ray Cross, who had worked as an external consultant with Taylor and LDC to create the business plan to present to Lloyds for the 2000 management buyout from Carlton. Taylor was subsequently diagnosed with cancer in December 2008 and died in June 2009.

Research and development director Paul Kellar MBE, who had been key to Quantel's previous technology leadership, immediately resigned on hearing of Taylor's ousting and Neil Hinson was promoted to replace Kellar by Cross. Hinson had joined Quantel in 1980 and played a pivotal part in the design of many of the most successful Quantel products including Harry, Henry, Mirage and Clipbox as well as the later generationQ family of products but was also quickly replaced by Cross with another Quantel employee, Simon Rogers in December 2008.

In the autumn of 2008 Cross made a sizeable round of redundancies, saying that the company was moving towards being more software-based. Cross engaged in another round of redundancies in April 2009, giving the reason that the global recession has been deeper than had been planned for. Cross made further redundancies in October 2012, as quarterly results were not as good as expected.

In March 2014 Quantel acquired Snell Ltd. (also owned by Lloyds), and began the consolidation of the two companies. Cross made further redundancies, primarily in the former Snell organisation. Like Quantel, Snell (as Snell and Wilcox) had formerly been a major player in the broadcast space, but also like Quantel, had seen a long-term decline in its market position and profitability. Although both companies produced media technology, each had quite separate but complementary products.

In its heyday under Taylor, Quantel was ranked in the top four broadcast vendors and had one of the strongest brand names. Finally after almost 10 years of Cross downsizing Quantel and after apparently several failed attempts to sell the business, Cross himself was forcibly removed in March 2015—allegedly partly following senior staff complaints about Cross to backers Lloyds Development Capital—and replaced by former Grass Valley CEO Tim Thorsteinson, chosen on a "proven track record of value creation". Thorsteinson subsequently sacked the entire Quantel board of directors. Finally, in September 2015, the Quantel name was dropped and the residual business placed inside the Snell operation, branded as Snell Advanced Media (SAM). Thorsteinson has previously been involved in downsizing and restructuring other broadcast companies, such as Grass Valley and Harris, in order to prepare them for sale, which was the role LDC had originally brought Cross in to Quantel to achieve.

=== Timeline ===
- 1973 TBC 2000 / TBC 2200 - Time base corrector.
- 1975 DFS 3000 - Digital framestore synchroniser.
- 1977 DSC 4002 - Digital video standards converter.
- 1977 Intellect (Sold under Micro Consultants brand name) - Built for image processing research, including the design of the brush profiles on Paintbox. It was used for a wide variety of commercial and military applications including ANPR camera robotic imaging research. More Compact Intellect 100 launched in 1979
- 1978 DPE 5000 - Digital processing effects. One of the first digital video effects systems.
- 1981 DLS 6000 - Digital library system with basic video effects
- 1981 DPB 7000 Digital Paint Box - prototype paint system, with features added for the production model, launched in 1982.
- 1982 DVM 8000 Mirage - 3D real-time video effects processor.
- 1983 Cypher - 2D and 3D character generator
- 1983 Crystal (Sold under Micro Consultants brand name) - enhancement of monochrome still images from electron microscopes, used mainly by scientists doing semiconductor and medical research
- 1983 Encore -digital video effects machine
- 1984 GPB Graphic Paintbox - print quality Paintbox prototype was revealed at IPEX at the NEC in Birmingham
- 1984 Henry prototype shown at NAB Las Vegas, soon renamed Harry - Non-Linear Editor.
- 1985 Sapphire (Sold under Micro Consultants brand name) - a version of Crystal with special input video processing to allow processing of monochrome video data from x-ray systems.
- 1985 Revue (Sold under Micro Consultants brand name) - a digital disk recorder allowing the replay of short lengths of collected data
- 1985 IDIS (Sold under Micro Consultants brand name) - X-Ray (fluorography) image enhancement machine which combined Revue and Sapphire into a medical system for early digital x-ray angiography
- 1985 Scanline (Sold under Micro Consultants brand name) - a 'military' version of Crystal, taking inputs from radar or thermal sensors with data collected as the aircraft flew along
- 1985 The Military Paintbox - combined with Scanline, Crystal and Revue for a wide range of applications from simulations and reconnaissance, to analysis of data and briefing graphics
- 1986 Central Library - image filing system
- 1986 Satin - 4:2:2 digital standards converter
- 1989 Paintbox V - Second generation Paintbox, faster and smaller.
- 1989 Florence (Sold under Micro Consultants brand name) - high definition video standards converter for the medical industry
- 1990 Picturebox - Digital still store. Capacity is 520MB or 500 images. Increased to 1000 images with Picturebox twin.
- 1990 Harriet - Manipulating live graphics over video. Capacity is 323 PAL frames (around 12 seconds).
- 1992 Henry - Effects Editor which became the mainstay of the post industry across the world in the mid-nineties.
- 1992 HAL - Video design suite.
- 1993 Desktop Paintbox - print quality paintbox which could connect to a Mac
- 1993 Dylan - 20 disk RAID external storage package for video and audio.
- 1993 Editbox - Online NLE.
- 1993 Domino - A film-in, film-out digital optical system that was a Paintbox and HAL for the movie industry
- 1994 Clipbox - Multi-user video server
- 1994 Printbox - pre-press machine for publishers which could integrate with Mac and PC computers through Quantel's "Courier" image management system
- 1994 GPB2 - cheaper desktop-size version of Graphic Paintbox but with new CMYK colour cards
- 1995 Open Picturenet - Networking for Quantel products
- 1998 Inspiration - Integrated news and sports production system
- 2000 PaintboxFX - a higher spec and more compact version of HAL, with three internal disk drives instead of the separate Dylan
- 2000 iQ - Media editing and compositing platform
- 2002 generationQ - Harnesses uncompressed storage through using Dylans, and runs on an 'open platform' allowing easier networking between machines and file sharing. The new generation of products included the iQ, for digital intermediate, eQ for post and editing, and gQ, aimed towards the graphics market.
- 2004 Enterprise sQ - second-generation fast-turnaround production system for news and sports applications. ESPN equips its new Bristol, CT Digital Center with Enterprise sQ HD production system.
- 2005 Paintbox - New Paintbox launched which is a powerful design and compositing tool. Dealing with the moving image, and still images, this new Paintbox was named in honour of the original Paintbox created in 1981.
- 2005 Newsbox - A complete television newsroom production system to record, edit and playout news material
- 2005 Pablo - Nonlinear Color grading system - Quantel's first fully featured color corrector
- 2005 Picturebox sQ - Graphics server for stills and moving sequences
- 2006 Pablo HD - High definition color grading system
- 2006 Newsbox HD - High definition capable version of Newsbox
- 2006 Marco - Software only DV field editor
- 2007 Mission - Media and asset management system
- 2007 Stereoscopic 3D - 3D post-production system
- 2008 Pablo Neo - Ergonomic 'heads up' control panel for Pablo post-production system
- 2010 QTube - Global media workflow technology, enabling viewing and editing of media from anywhere, using the Internet.
- 2012 revolutionQ - Allows the use of 'off the shelf' IT storage rather than traditionally expensive Quantel dedicated video storage
- 2012 Pablo Rio (2015: Quantel Rio) - software color correction and finishing system

== Headquarters and manufacturing ==
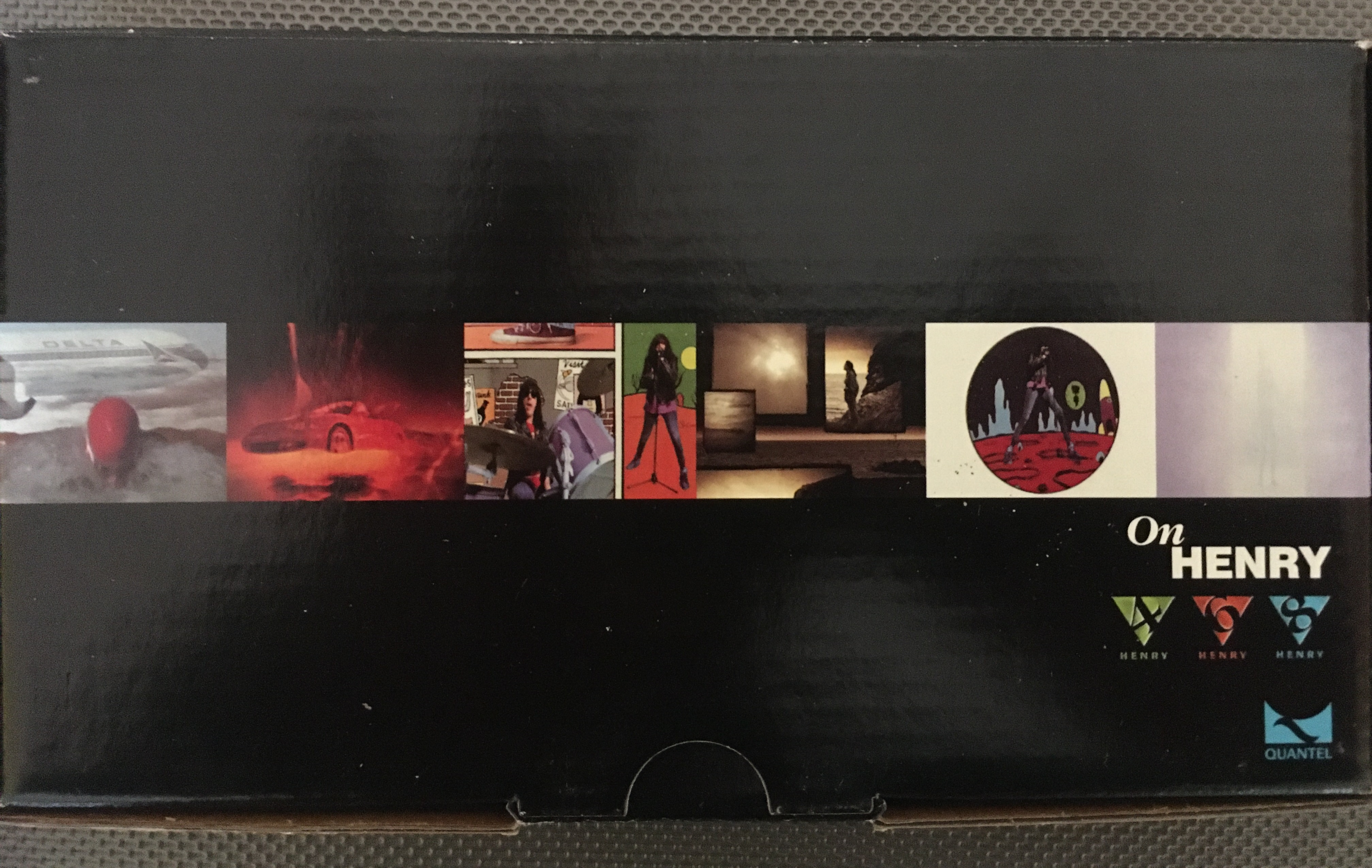
Hardware-based systems like Henry declined after 1995 due to software-based rivals

Quantel was based at 31 Turnpike Road, Newbury, Berkshire, England since 1982. The 126,000 sq ft (11,700 m^{2}) building was built on the 6.7-acre (27,000 m^{2}) site in 1940 for Vickers Armstrong and manufactured Spitfire fighter aircraft during World War II. Air raid shelters are still present in the grounds of the site. Other users of the building included the Post Office and the Ministry of Transport.

A large part of the site was dedicated to manufacturing. It is now very rare that companies manufacture their own products due to the complex nature of multiple layer circuit boards containing high density surface mounted components. It is more common now to design complex circuits on a computer and await delivery of a ready built board or simply use off the shelf IT.

As part of restructuring during the 1990s, Quantel decided to outsource support of legacy products to a separate company Effect Systems. Also based in Newbury and staffed by many ex Quantel staff, Effect Systems took over support for products. These include Editbox, Henry, Hal, Paintbox, Picturebox, Domino as well as older products dating back to the 1980s including Mirage, Harry and Encore. On 1 October 2008 Quantel ended the outsourcing contract with Effect Systems. Effect continued to offer independent support for Quantel legacy equipment (Paintbox V, Picturebox, Henry, Editbox and Domino) but has now ceased that support and in 2016 disposed of the inventory of spare parts.

== Products ==
Traditionally, Quantel systems were based around proprietary hardware and software. With the introduction of the generationQ range a number of Quantel products were based on Microsoft Windows and standard PC hardware with occasional use of custom hardware.

Despite Quantel holding hundreds of Patents for inventions that many other companies utilized, such as the pressure sensitive stylus first used on the 1981 Paintbox, the company only ever sued three other companies for Patent infringement. Due to the high profile of the cases against Spaceward for their Matisse, which was marketed as a cheaper version of Paintbox and Adobe Systems for Patented elements within its Photoshop software, Quantel were unfairly accused of trying to suppress and control competitors. Quantel won their case against Spaceward in London and blocked further sales, though let the company service the systems already sold. In a different case, Quantel was portrayed as a British company trying to destroy Adobe. The case partly hinged on first use of a digital airbrush. Adobe's lawyers found a prior use of the airbrush by academics at NYIT which predated Quantel's Patent, therefore invalidating it and greatly influencing the judge's decision to dismiss the case. Quantel v. Adobe paint (airbrushing and matting) patent infringement trial, Wilmington, Delaware, September 1997. All five of Quantel’s US patents in the case are invalidated. Adobe and Photoshop are exonerated.

The majority of Quantel products used code names for some parts of their systems before launch. One source of code names was the television series The Magic Roundabout. The Dylan disk system and the Zebedee processor take their names from characters in this series. Quantel's product names often seemed random but Henry, Harry, Harriet and HAL were chosen as they stood out in the broadcast arena where technology was named in a more mathematical acronym way.

As well as news, sports and weather graphics, Quantel video technology was used extensively in production of a wide spectrum of TV shows, from Top of the Pops in the UK, to the American television series Star Trek: The Next Generation.

Many of the major movies released since 1999 were created or manipulated using Quantel technology, including Star Wars episode 2 and 3, The Lord of the Rings: The Fellowship of the Ring, The Day After Tomorrow, and Sin City. Users of sQ server based systems include ESPN in the US, Rogers Media in Canada, and BBC, BSkyB and QVC in the United Kingdom. As of 2025, the Quantel system is still in use in newsrooms and edit suites at BBC News and Sky News, with the edit applications known as QEdit or Rio depending on the release version.

Quantel effects appear in many TV Commercials and music videos, including the winner of the first MTV Award and most famously, Dire Straits' Money For Nothing

Quantel-designed technologies include:

- Dynamic rounding - Dynamic rounding was a technique devised by Quantel for truncating the word length of pixels – an unavoidable byproduct of processing images. Rather than simply losing the lower bits, dynamic rounding uses their information to control, via a randomiser, the dither of the LSB of the truncated result. This effectively removes any artefacts that would otherwise be visible. Dynamic rounding is non-cumulative on any number of passes and produces statistically correct results. Dynamic rounding eliminates any truncation artefacts.
- FrameMagic - A system used on video servers where video clips are treated as individual frames rather than a single clip. This allows very efficient use of storage as only frames used in subsequent edits need to be kept from an original recording. This allows the rest of the unused frames to be discarded.
- TimeMagic - A background rendering system which renders editing effects as the operator continues working.
- Resolution Co-existence - Allows a video edit to be made up of different formats of source material without any extra work required by the operator. One example is an edit that will play out standard definition but some parts of the edit may be part of a high definition source clip.
- Genetic Engineering - A technology that allowed multiple users to work on the same media independently without having to have multiple copies of it.
