= Grass Valley (company) =

Canadian broadcast equipment manufacturer

Grass Valley Group
- Logo of Grass Valley since October 2021
- Type: Subsidiary
- Industry: Broadcasting
- Founded: April 7, 1959; 67 years ago
- Headquarters: Montreal, Quebec, Canada
- Key people: Louis Hernandez Jr. (CEO); Jon Wilson (President & COO); Ian Fletcher (CTO); Tim Banks (CRO-Chief Revenue Officer); Adam Marshall (CPO-Chief Product Officer); Christian Bernard (CSCO-Chief Supply Chain Officer); Stephanie Sanchex (CSO-Chief Strategy Officer)
- Parent: Black Dragon Capital
- Website: grassvalley.com

Grass Valley (formerly known as Thomson Grass Valley and Grass Valley Group) is a manufacturer of television production and broadcasting equipment. Headquartered in Montreal, Quebec, it was formed by the March 2014 merger of the original Grass Valley with Miranda Technologies, which were both acquired by American networking company Belden in 2014 and 2012, respectively. In February 2018, owners Belden merged Grass Valley with newly acquired Snell Advanced Media (formerly known as Quantel Ltd, Snell, Snell & Wilcox, Snell Limited, SAM, and Snell Group). On July 2, 2020, Grass Valley announced the completion of its acquisition by private equity firm Black Dragon Capital from Belden Inc.

== History ==
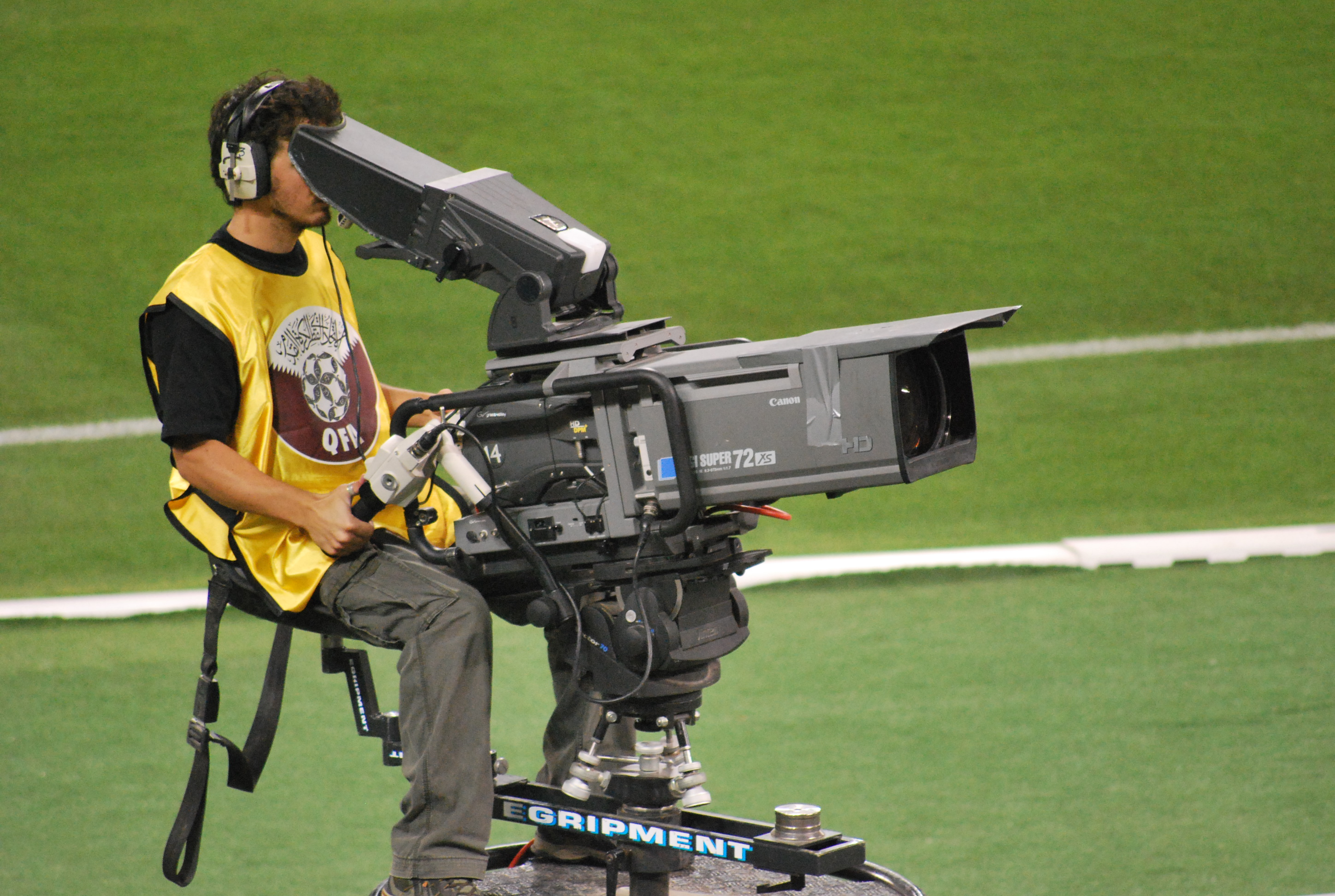
Grass Valley camera in use on a sports outside broadcast

Grass Valley Group was founded as a research and development company in 1959 by Dr. Donald Hare in Grass Valley, California, in the foothills of California's Sierra Nevada range. Hare chose Grass Valley after learning about it from his friend, Charles Litton Sr. In 1964, Grass Valley demonstrated its first video product, a video distribution amplifier in a hotel room at the National Association of Broadcasters convention in Chicago. In 1965, Grass Valley officially attended the 1965 National Association of Broadcasters convention in Washington, D.C. On display were its processing amplifier, video distribution amplifier, Synac processing module, and sync generator. By 1968, the Grass Valley Group had introduced its first production switcher, or vision mixer, that "came to define the industry standard."

The company merged with Tektronix in 1974. When Tektronix divested its printing, video, and networking divisions it sold the video business to a private investor, Terry Gooding of San Diego, California, who reincorporated it under the name Grass Valley Group, Inc. The sale closed on September 24, 1999.

In 2002, the French electronics company Thomson Multimedia, now known as Technicolor SA, acquired Grass Valley Group. After coming under the ownership of Thomson, Grass Valley Group merged its product line with the existing professional and broadcast products of its new parent company.

In 2005, Thomson purchased Canopus Corporation to add to Grass Valley's business, also adopting its video-editing software Edius.

After the 2008 financial crisis, Thomson defaulted on its financial covenants and was forced by its creditors to divest its Grass Valley business, PRN, and other manufacturing entities. On January 29, 2009, Thomson announced it was putting the Grass Valley division up for sale.

In 2010, the Grass Valley business unit, not including the head-end and transmission businesses, was acquired by private equity firm Francisco Partners and resumed operating as an independent company with offices in San Francisco, California, on January 1, 2011. The company announced in August 2013 it would move its headquarters to Hillsboro, Oregon, later that year to an existing office.

On March 31, 2014, the company was acquired from Francisco Partners by Belden Inc. and merged with Miranda Technologies, which Belden acquired on July 27, 2012. The merged company operates as Grass Valley.

In 2018, Belden acquired SAM (re-badged from Quantel) and merged it into Grass Valley.

On October 30, 2019, Belden Inc. put Grass Valley up for sale, listing it as a "discontinued operation" on its books.

On February 4, 2020, Black Dragon Capital signed a definitive agreement with Belden Inc. to acquire Grass Valley. The transaction closed in the first half of 2020, following the receipt of regulatory approvals and other closing conditions. More recently, the Grass Valley logo is rendered without "A Belden Brand" byline, marking the company's departure from Belden.

On July 2, 2020, Grass Valley announced the completion of its acquisition from Belden Inc. by private equity firm Black Dragon Capital.

On July 2, 2020, Grass Valley entered a Pledge And Security Agreement with MGG Investment Group LP of New York, NY. Under the terms of the Agreement, Grass Valley assigned to MGG a security interest in substantially all of its global assets (including intellectual property) as collateral for a term loan made to Grass Valley.

On November 9, 2021, Grass Valley announced the removal of former CEO Tim Shoulders and the appointment of Louis Hernandez as executive chairman.

On January 10, 2022, Nicola Wealth, a Canadian investment firm, announced the acquisition of Grass Valley's headquarters at 3499 Douglas B Floreani Street, Saint-Laurent (Montréal), in Quebec.

On March 9, 2022, Grass Valley announced the appointment of Andrew Cross as chief executive officer. As of November 1, 2022, Andrew Cross is listed as advisor on the company's website.

On March 3, 2023, Grass Valley completed the sale of its former U.S. headquarters facility located at 125 Crown Point Court in Grass Valley, California, to the non-profit organization InConcert Sierra. The buyer's agent reported the final sell price was less than the original list price of US$3.1 million.

== Products ==
Grass Valley manufactures television production and broadcasting equipment. Its product line includes cameras, live production switchers, replay and highlights products, media storage, editing, asset management, modular infrastructure, routing, conversion equipment, control, monitoring, and automated playout, sold as hardware, software, and software as a service (SaaS).
