= With a Bare Bodkin =

1946 novel

- Author: Cyril Hare
- Language: English
- Series: Francis Pettigrew; Inspector Mallett
- Genre: Detective
- Publisher: Faber and Faber
- Publication date: 1946
- Publication place: United Kingdom
- Media type: Print
- Preceded by: Tragedy at Law
- Followed by: When the Wind Blows

With a Bare Bodkin is a 1946 detective novel by the British author Cyril Hare. It was the second in his series featuring the lawyer Francis Pettigrew and also saw the return of Inspector Mallet of Scotland Yard who had appeared in the previous book Tragedy at Law. The title is taken from the To be, or not to be speech in William Shakespeare's Hamlet. It was inspired by the author's time working for the Minister of Economic Warfare during the Second World War.

== Synopsis ==
For the duration of the war barrister Francis Pettigrew gives up his practice at the Middle Temple and goes to work for the Board of Control for pin manufacture in Marsett bay. He lives in accommodation with various other members of the department, most of whom are wartime civil servants drawn from the industry itself. To cope with the boredom, several of the other residents press one of their number - a middling writer of detective fiction - to draw up a fictional plot in which the controller of the department is murdered. Several of them go wholeheartedly into this, planning it as a stabbing with a bodkin. The killer they select is the eccentric Miss Danville.

When a few weeks later Miss Danville is herself stabbed to death with a bodkin. The coincidence suggests it might have something to do with the plot. Equally, the engagement of his shy, attractive secretary may have provided a motive of sorts. Inspector Mallet, on secondment from Scotland Yard to investigate black market activity linked to insider trading at the Board of Control, is called in to oversee the murder case.

== Bibliography ==
- Hubin, Allen J. Crime Fiction, 1749-1980: A Comprehensive Bibliography. Garland Publishing, 1984.
- Herbert, Rosemary. Whodunit?: A Who's Who in Crime & Mystery Writing. Oxford University Press, 2003.
- Magill, Frank Northen. Critical Survey of Mystery and Detective Fiction: Authors, Volume 1. Salem Press, 1988.
- Reilly, John M. Twentieth Century Crime & Mystery Writers. Springer, 2015.
