= Marcel Berlins =

French-born journalist and lawyer (1941–2019)

- Born: 30 October 1941; Marseille, France
- Died: 31 July 2019 (aged 77)
- Education: University of the Witwatersrand; London School of Economics
- Occupations: Journalist, broadcaster
- Notable credit: Law in Action (BBC Radio 4)

Marcel Berlins (30 October 1941 – 31 July 2019) was a French lawyer, writer and broadcaster. He was best known for his work in the United Kingdom, writing for British national newspapers The Times and The Guardian, presenting BBC Radio 4's legal programme Law in Action for 16 years, and teaching Media Law at City, University of London.

== Biography ==
Berlins was born in Marseille, France, on 30 October 1941, the only child of Jacques Berlins and his wife, Pearl. Of Latvian-Jewish heritage, they had moved to France to open a hotel. When the country was occupied by the Nazis in 1940, Jacques became active in the Resistance; the family moved to a village near Luberon. In 1951, the family moved to South Africa. There Berlins learnt English, reputedly in part through reading the works of Agatha Christie. He remained a French citizen, however, and voted in the 2007 French presidential election. Berlins studied law at the University of the Witwatersrand and spent his early career in the courts in Johannesburg.

The worsening political situation in South Africa saw Berlins move firstly to Paris, and then to London to avoid French military service. In London he studied for his masters degree at the London School of Economics.

He was a legal assistant in the UK Lord Chancellor's Department from 1969 to 1971.

Berlins wrote a weekly column for The Guardian, and regularly reviewed crime fiction for The Times. He began presenting BBC Radio 4's legal affairs programme Law in Action in 1988, and won two awards for Legal Broadcaster of the Year, before retiring from the programme in 2004. He was a contestant for the South of England team in the 2007 series of Radio 4's Round Britain Quiz and continued in the series until 2014. He devised and presented, for London Weekend Television, the first television drama-documentary to feature real lawyers and judges doing their job and created and edited the award-winning publication The Law Magazine.

Berlins was a visiting professor at City, University of London, in the Department of Journalism. He taught Media Law to students on the Postgraduate Diplomas in Broadcast Journalism, Magazine Journalism, Newspaper Journalism and Television Current Affairs Journalism, as well as the BA in Journalism and a Social Science.

Berlins was played piano throughout his life, including stints at a club in Lourenço Marques in Mozambique, and at the public piano in St Pancras railway station. In one of his last articles for The Guardian, Berlins wrote of the impact on him of Orson Welles’s portrayal of Clarence Darrow, the American lawyer who defended two high-profile murderers facing the death penalty in 1924, which had inspired his interest in justice and the law.

== Personal life ==
In 2005, Berlins married Lisa Forrell, a lawyer and theatre director. Their jointly-authored play, Best of Motives (2002), considered the unintended impact of anti-terrorism legislation, passed after the September 11 attacks. They had homes in Paris, London and Provence.

== Death ==
Berlins died on 31 July 2019, following a brain haemorrhage.

Dr Paul Lashmar of the Department of Journalism at City, University of London, said: "Marcel really was a brilliant commentator on the law. He made it accessible to the ordinary reader. And what’s more, he did so with a sense of humanity. His wonderful writing will be missed."

Berlins is survived by his widow and a stepson and a stepdaughter.

== Books ==
- Caught in the Act (1974), (with Geoffrey Wansell), a study of young offenders and their treatment
- Ramesh Maharaj, Barrister Behind Bars (1979), the true story of a Trinidadian lawyer’s detention
- Living Together (1982), (with Clare Dyer), on the legal pitfalls of cohabitation
- The Law Machine (1982), (with Clare Dyer), the evolution of the justice system evolved and how it operates
- The Law and You (1986), for the Consumers’ Association, examining aspects of consumer law

== Plays ==
- Best of Motives (2002), (with Lisa Forrell), about antiterrorism laws after the September 11 attacks
