= 1928 =

1928 in various calendars
- Gregorian calendar: 1928; MCMXXVIII
- Ab urbe condita: 2681
- Armenian calendar: 1377; ԹՎ ՌՅՀԷ
- Assyrian calendar: 6678
- Baháʼí calendar: 84–85
- Balinese saka calendar: 1849–1850
- Bengali calendar: 1334–1335
- Berber calendar: 2878
- British Regnal year: 18 Geo. 5 – 19 Geo. 5
- Buddhist calendar: 2472
- Burmese calendar: 1290
- Byzantine calendar: 7436–7437
- Chinese calendar: 丁卯年 (Fire Rabbit); 4625 or 4418 — to — 戊辰年 (Earth Dragon); 4626 or 4419
- Coptic calendar: 1644–1645
- Discordian calendar: 3094
- Ethiopian calendar: 1920–1921
- Hebrew calendar: 5688–5689
- Hindu calendars
- Vikram Samvat: 1984–1985
- Shaka Samvat: 1849–1850
- Kali Yuga: 5028–5029
- Holocene calendar: 11928
- Igbo calendar: 928–929
- Iranian calendar: 1306–1307
- Islamic calendar: 1346–1347
- Japanese calendar: Shōwa 3 (昭和３年)
- Javanese calendar: 1858–1859
- Juche calendar: 17
- Julian calendar: Gregorian minus 13 days
- Korean calendar: 4261
- Minguo calendar: ROC 17 民國17年
- Nanakshahi calendar: 460
- Thai solar calendar: 2470–2471
- Tibetan calendar: མེ་མོ་ཡོས་ལོ་ (female Fire-Hare); 2054 or 1673 or 901 — to — ས་ཕོ་འབྲུག་ལོ་ (male Earth-Dragon); 2055 or 1674 or 902

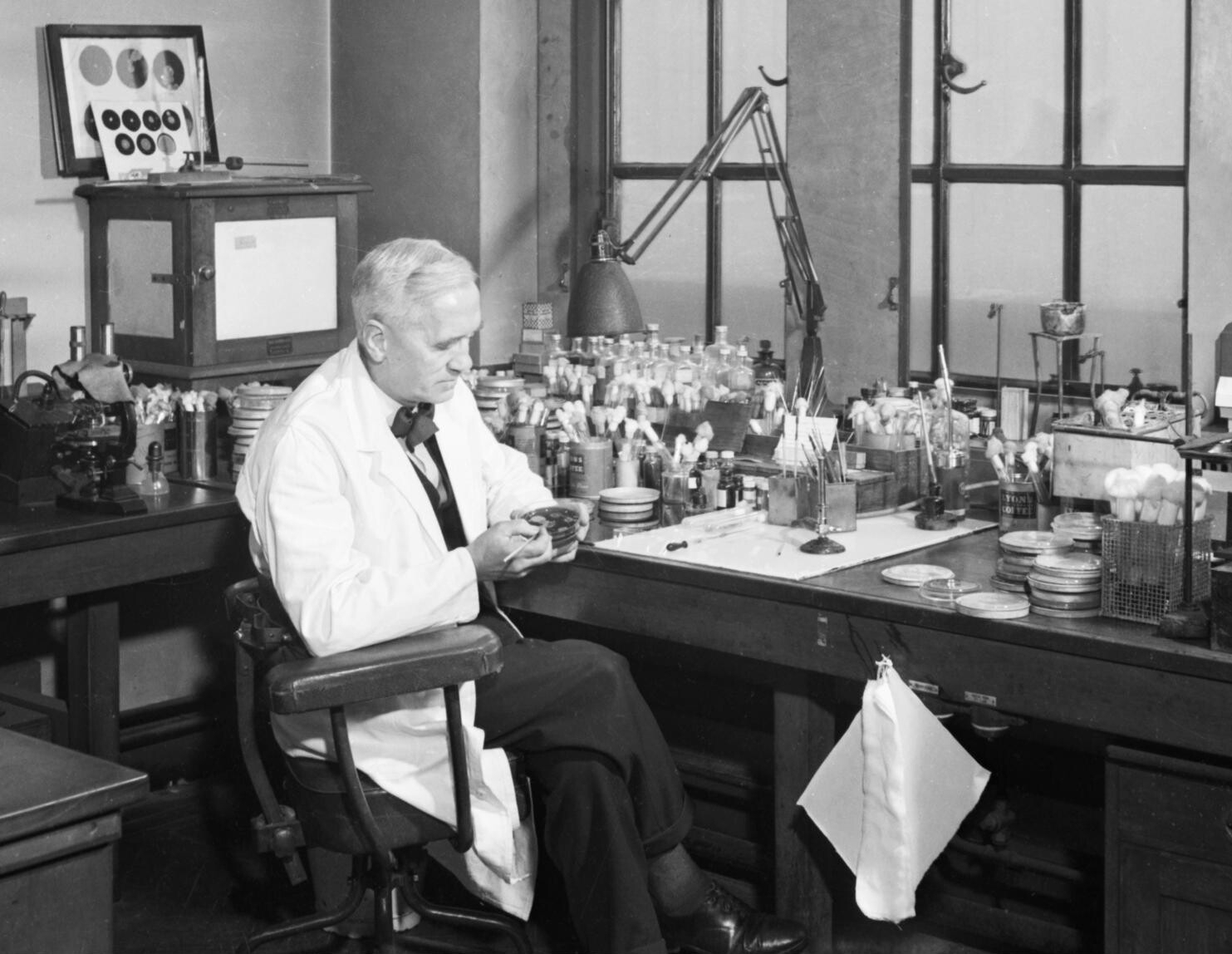
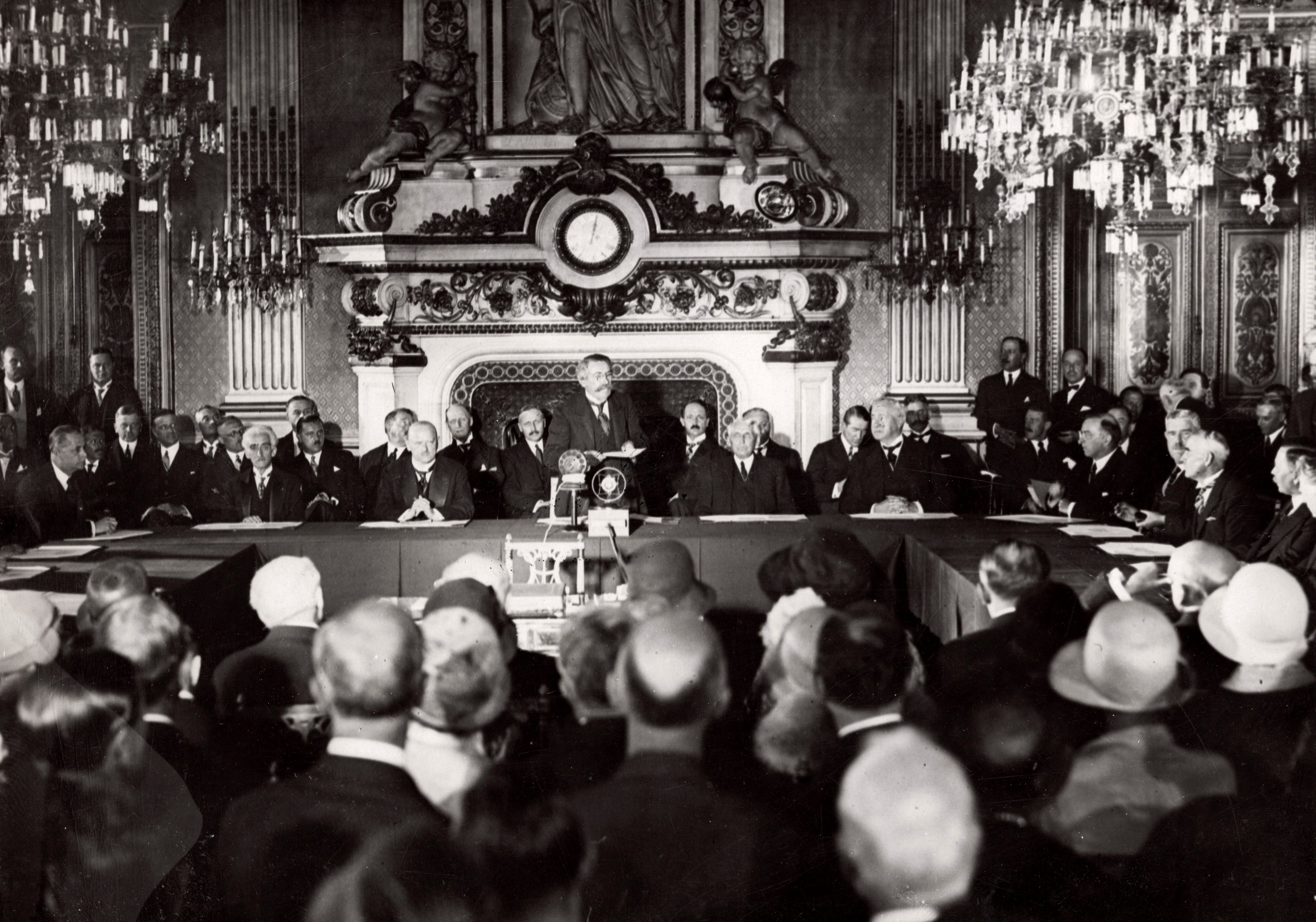
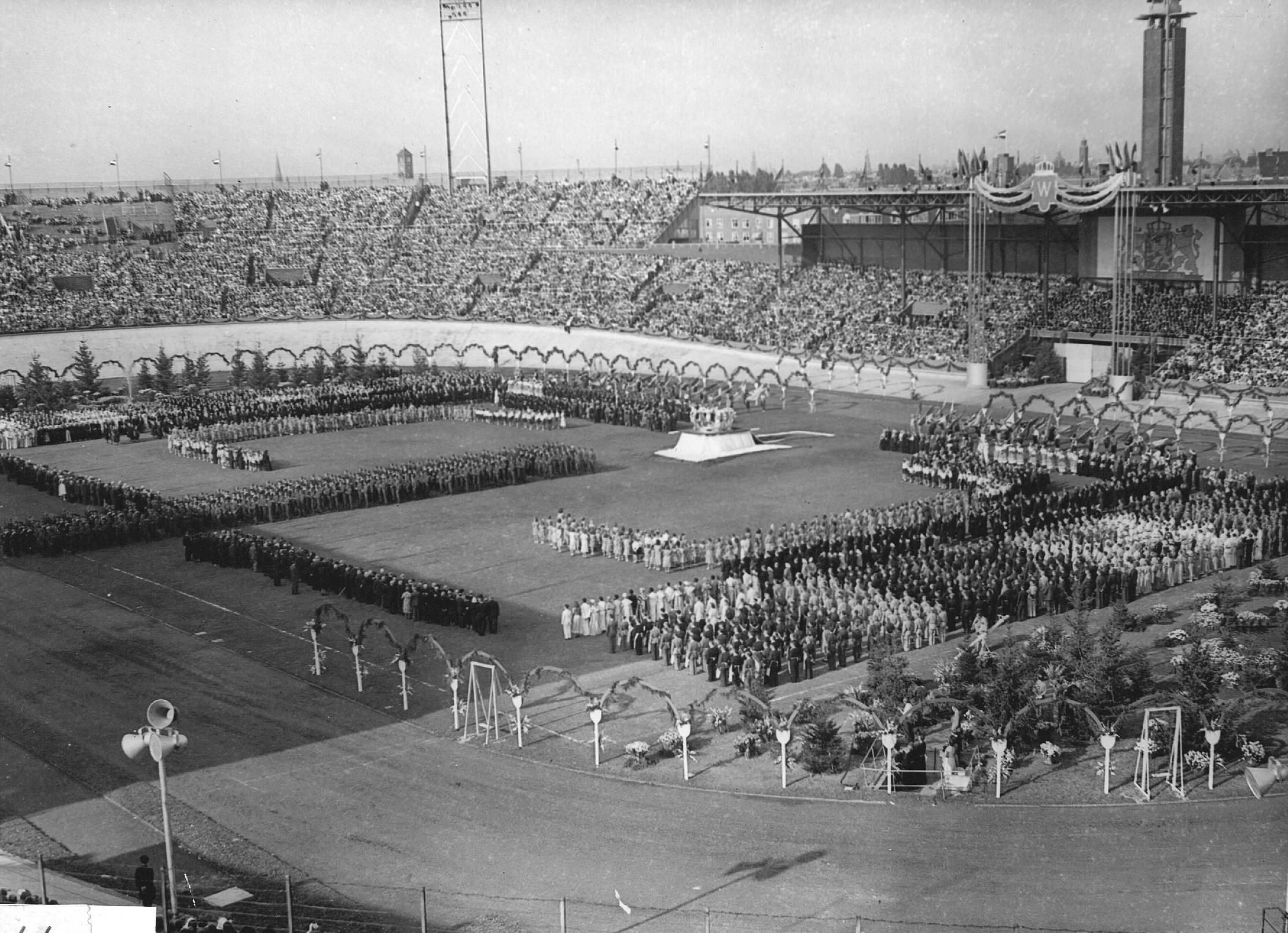
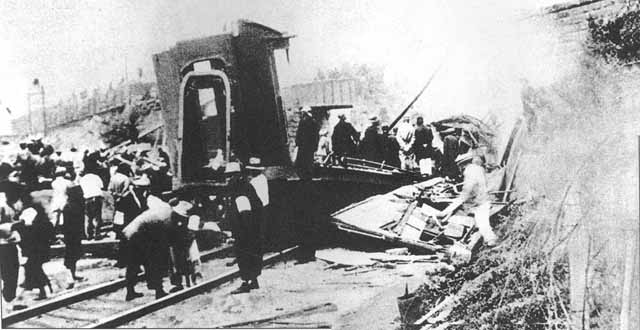
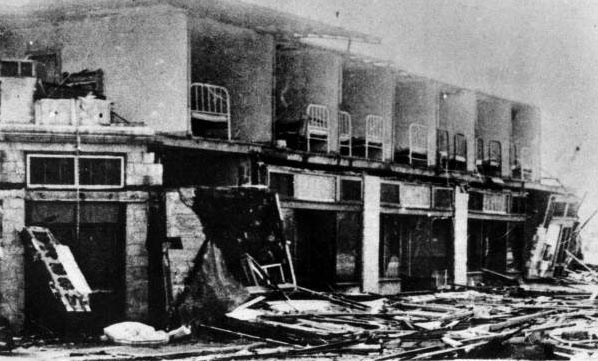
From top to bottom, left to right:
- The discovery of penicillin by Alexander Fleming revolutionizes medicine as the first true antibiotic;
- The Kellogg–Briand Pact sees major powers renounce war as national policy, reflecting interwar idealism;
- The 1928 Summer Olympics in Amsterdam mark the first women’s track and field events;
- The Huanggutun incident assassinates warlord Zhang Zuolin, aiding Nationalist consolidation in China;
- The 1928 Okeechobee hurricane kills thousands in Florida and the Caribbean;
- Steamboat Willie debuts Mickey Mouse, launching a new era in animation and pop culture.

1928 (MCMXXVIII) was a leap year starting on Sunday of the Gregorian calendar, the 1928th year of the Common Era (CE) and Anno Domini (AD) designations, the 928th year of the 2nd millennium, the 28th year of the 20th century, and the 9th year of the 1920s decade.

== Events ==
=== January ===
- January – British bacteriologist Frederick Griffith reports the results of Griffith's experiment, indirectly demonstrating that DNA is the genetic material.
- January 1 – Eastern Bloc emigration and defection: Boris Bazhanov, Joseph Stalin's personal secretary, crosses the border to Iran to defect from the Soviet Union.
- January 17 – The OGPU arrests Leon Trotsky in Moscow; he assumes a status of passive resistance and is exiled with his family.
- January 26 – The volcanic island Anak Krakatau appears.

=== February ===
- February – The Ford River Rouge Complex at Dearborn, Michigan, an automobile plant begun in 1917, is completed as the world's largest integrated factory.
- February 8 – Scottish-born inventor John Logie Baird broadcasts a transatlantic television signal from London to Hartsdale, New York.
- February 11 – 19 – The 1928 Winter Olympics are held in St. Moritz, Switzerland, the first as a separate event. Sonja Henie of Norway wins her first gold medal, in women's figure skating.
- February 20 – The Japanese general election produces a hung parliament.
- February 25 – Charles Jenkins Laboratories of Washington, D.C., becomes the first holder of a television license from the Federal Radio Commission.

=== March ===
- March 15
  - March 15 incident: The Japanese government cracks down on socialists and communists, arresting over 1,000 people.
  - Chinese warlord Shi Yousan sets fire to the Shaolin Monastery in Henan, destroying some of its ancient structures and artifacts.
- March 21 – Charles Lindbergh is presented with the Medal of Honor for his first transatlantic flight.
- March 22 – The Muslim Brotherhood is founded in Egypt by Islamic scholar and schoolteacher Hassan al-Banna.
- March 24 – Excavation work begins after the old Canaanite city of Ugarit is accidentally rediscovered.

=== April ===
- April 10 – Pineapple Primary: The United States Republican Party primary elections in Chicago are preceded by violence, bombings and assassination attempts (two politicians are killed, Octavius C. Granady and Giuseppe Esposito).
- April 12 – A bomb attack against Italian Fascist leader Benito Mussolini in Milan kills 17 bystanders.
- April 13 – The West Plains, Missouri Dance Hall explosion occurs.
- April 12 – 14 – The first east–west transatlantic flight by aeroplane takes place from Dublin, Ireland, to Greenly Island, Canada, using the German Junkers W 33 Bremen.
- April 14 – An earthquake occurs in Chirpan, Bulgaria, followed four days later by another in Plovdiv. Between them, they destroy more than 21,000 buildings, and kill almost 130 people.
- April 19 – Publication of the original Oxford English Dictionary is completed after 70 years with issue of the last section ("wise – wyze") in Oxford.
- April 22 – An Ms 6.0 earthquake affects southern Greece with a maximum Mercalli intensity of IX (Violent), leaving 20 dead, and destroying 3,000 homes in Corinth; a non-destructive tsunami is also observed.
- April 28 – 28 inches of snow fall in southern-central Pennsylvania, United States.

=== May ===
- May 3 – Jinan incident: An armed conflict between the Imperial Japanese Army (allied with Northern Chinese warlords) and the Kuomintang's southern army occurs in Jinan, China.
- May 7 – Passage of the Representation of the People Act in the United Kingdom lowers the voting age for women from 30 to 21, giving them equal suffrage with men from July 2.
- May 10 – The first regular schedule of television programming begins in Schenectady, New York, by General Electric's television station W2XB (the station is popularly known as WGY Television, after its sister radio station WGY).
- May 15 – The animated short Plane Crazy is released by Disney Studios in Los Angeles, featuring the first appearances of Mickey and Minnie Mouse (in a non-distributed film).
- May 23 – A bomb attack against the Italian consulate in Buenos Aires, Argentina, kills 22 and injures 43.
- May 24 – The airship Italia crashes at the North Pole; one of the occupants is Italian general Umberto Nobile. A rescue expedition leaves for the Pole on May 30. Roald Amundsen will be among those who lose their lives in the search for survivors.
- May 30 – Rookie driver Louis Meyer wins his first Indianapolis 500 (he will win that race again, in 1933 and 1936).

Flag of South Africa from 1928 to 1994

- May 31 – South Africa adopts a new national flag, based upon the Van Riebeeck flag or Prinsevlag (originally the Dutch flag), to replace the Red Ensign. It later became infamously known as the "apartheid flag" for being the flag of South Africa under Apartheid from 1948 to 1994.

=== June ===
- June 4 – Huanggutun incident: Zhang Zuolin, a warlord, is killed by Japanese agents in China.
- June 8 – By seizing Beijing and renaming it Běipíng, the National Revolutionary Army puts an end to the 'Fengtian warlords' Beiyang government there.
- June 9
  - Australian aviator Charles Kingsford Smith and his crew complete the first flight across the Pacific Ocean, from the mainland United States to Australia, in the Fokker F.VII aircraft Southern Cross. Having left Oakland, California on May 31, they reach Brisbane via Honolulu and Fiji.
  - Ellis Park Stadium, a well-known sport venue of South Africa, officially opens in Johannesburg.
- June 14 – Students take over the medical wing of Rosario University in Argentina.
- June 17 – 18 – Aviator Amelia Earhart becomes the first woman to make a successful transatlantic flight, as a passenger in a Fokker F.VIIb/3m piloted by Wilmer Stultz, from Newfoundland to Wales.
- June 20 – Puniša Račić kills three opposition representatives in the Yugoslavian Parliament, and injures three others, in a gun attack.
- June 24 – A Swedish aeroplane rescues some survivors of the Italian North Pole expedition, including Umberto Nobile. The Soviet icebreaker Krasin saves the rest July 12.
- June 28
  - The keel of the first 1,000 ft (300 m)-long ocean liner, Oceanic, for the British White Star Line, is laid by Harland and Wolff in Belfast; construction is delayed, and cancelled on 23 July 1929.
  - The International Railway (New York–Ontario) switches to one-man crews for its trolleys in Canada.
- June 29 – At the 1928 Democratic National Convention in Houston, Governor of New York Al Smith becomes the first Catholic nominated by a major political party for President of the United States.

=== July ===
- July 2 – Charles Jenkins Laboratories' W3XK station begins broadcasting on 6.42 MHz, using 48 lines.
- July 3 – Scottish inventor John Logie Baird demonstrates the world's first colour television transmission in Glasgow.
- July 7 – The first machine-sliced and machine-wrapped loaf of bread is sold in Chillicothe, Missouri, United States, using Otto Frederick Rohwedder's technology.
- July 17 – José de León Toral assassinates Álvaro Obregón, president-elect of Mexico.
- July 25 – The United States recalls its troops from China.
- July 28 – August 12 – The 1928 Summer Olympics are held in Amsterdam, opening with the lighting of the Olympic flame. Women's athletics and gymnastics debut at these games, and discus thrower Halina Konopacka of Poland becomes the first female Olympic gold medal winner for a track or field event. Coca-Cola enters Europe as sponsor of the games.

=== August ===
- August – Margaret Mead's influential cultural anthropology text, Coming of Age in Samoa, is published in the U.S.
- August 2 – Italy and Ethiopia sign the Italo-Ethiopian Treaty.
- August 16 – Serial killer Carl Panzram is arrested in Washington, D.C., for burglary. Later it will be discovered that he has committed multiple murders, rapes and other major crimes.
- August 22 – Al Smith accepts the Democratic nomination for the US presidential election, with WGY/W2XB simulcasting the event on radio and television.
- August 26 – In Scotland, May Donoghue finds the remains of a snail in her ginger beer, leading to the landmark negligence case Donoghue v Stevenson.
- August 27 – The Kellogg–Briand Pact is signed in Paris, the first treaty to outlaw aggressive war.
- August 29 – F.C. Motagua is founded as an Association football club in Honduras.

=== September ===
- September 1 – Ahmet Zogu, President of the Albanian Republic, declares the country to be a constitutional monarchy, the Albanian Kingdom, with himself as King Zog I.
- September 3 – Philo Farnsworth demonstrates to the press in San Francisco the world's first working all-electronic television system, employing electronic scanning in both the pickup and display devices.
- September 11 – The first broadcast of a play by television, melodrama The Queen's Messenger, on General Electric's W2XAD from Schenectady, New York, utilising techniques created by Ernst Alexanderson. WMAK (Kenmore) begins broadcasting in Buffalo, New York.
- September 12 – The Okeechobee hurricane hits Guadeloupe, killing 1,200 people.
- September 16 – The Okeechobee hurricane kills at least 2,500 people in Florida.
- September 25 – Paul and Joseph Galvin incorporate the Galvin Manufacturing Corporation (later known as Motorola and Freescale).
- September 28 – Scottish-born microbiologist Alexander Fleming, at St Mary's Hospital, London, accidentally rediscovers the antibiotic which he will call Penicillin.

=== October ===
- October – The women's organisation Gruaja Shiqiptare is founded in Albania, with Princess Senije as its chair.
- October 1 – Joseph Stalin launches the first five-year plan (1928–1932); the average nonfarm wage falls by 50% in the Soviet Union.
- October 2
  - Josemaría Escrivá founds Opus Dei.
  - Arvid Lindman returns as Prime Minister of Sweden, with his right-wing rival Ernst Trygger as Foreign Minister of Sweden.
- October 7 – Haile Selassie is crowned king (not yet emperor) of Abyssinia.
- October 8 – Chiang Kai-shek is named as Generalissimo (Chairman of the National Military Council) of the Nationalist Government of the Republic of China.
- October 12 – An iron lung respirator is used for the first time at Children's Hospital, Boston.
- October 22 – The Phi Sigma Alpha fraternity is founded at the University of Puerto Rico, Río Piedras Campus.
- October 25 – The International Red Cross and Red Crescent Movement (ICRM) is formally established, with the adoption of the "Statutes of the International Red Cross"
- October 28 – The Second Youth Congress is held in Batavia, Dutch East Indies by young Indonesian nationalists, resulting in the Youth Pledge. The Indonesian national anthem, "Indonesia Raya", is introduced at the congress.

=== November ===
- November 1 – Turkey passes a law switching the country from the Arabic to the Latin-based modern Turkish alphabet.
- November 6 – 1928 United States presidential election: Republican Herbert Hoover wins by a wide margin, over Democratic New York Governor Al Smith.
- November 9 – 16 – Radclyffe Hall's novel The Well of Loneliness (published on 27 July by Jonathan Cape in London, England) is tried and convicted on the grounds of obscenity due to its theme of lesbian love, following a newspaper campaign.
- November 10 – The enthronement ceremony of Emperor of Japan Hirohito is held, two years after he actually took the imperial throne on December 26, 1926, following the death of Emperor Taishō.
- November 12 – Liner SS Vestris develops a severe starboard list, is abandoned and sinks approximately 200 miles off Hampton Roads, Virginia; estimated deaths range from 110 to 127.
- November 14 – the Afghan Civil War begins as rebels besiege Jalalabad.
- November 17
  - 1928 Australian federal election: Stanley Bruce's Nationalist/Country Coalition Government is re-elected with a decreased majority, defeating the Labor Party led by James Scullin.
  - Boston Garden opens in Boston, Massachusetts.
- November 18 – Mickey Mouse makes his official debut in Steamboat Willie.
- November 22 – The one-movement ballet Boléro (music by Maurice Ravel, choreography by Bronislava Nijinska) premières at the Paris Opéra, to a commission by Ida Rubinstein.
- November 28 – Persija Jakarta Association football club is founded as Voetbalbond Indonesische Jacatra.

=== December ===
- December 3 – In Rio de Janeiro, a seaplane sent to greet Alberto Santos-Dumont crashes, killing all on board. The pilot had tried to avoid another plane which came too close.
- December 4 – Cosmo Gordon Lang is enthroned as the Archbishop of Canterbury, the first bachelor to be appointed in 150 years.
- December 6 – The government of Colombia sends military forces to suppress a month-long strike by United Fruit Company workers, resulting in an unknown number of deaths.
- December 21 – The United States Congress approves the construction of Boulder Dam, later renamed Hoover Dam.

=== Date unknown ===
- The women's organisation Anjuman-i Himayat-i-Niswan is founded in Afghanistan.

== Births ==
=== January ===
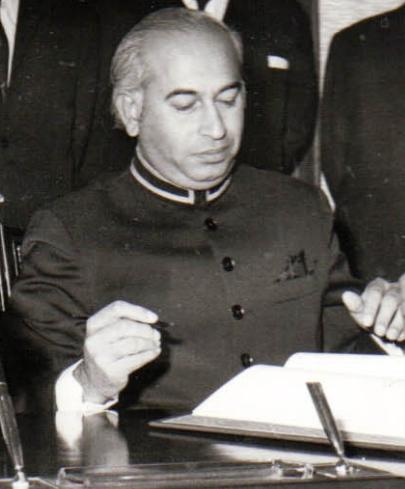
Zulfikar Ali Bhutto

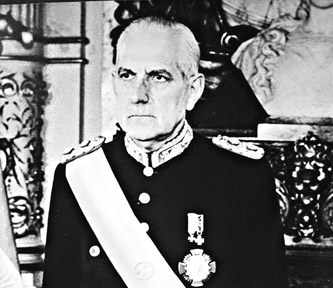
Reynaldo Bignone

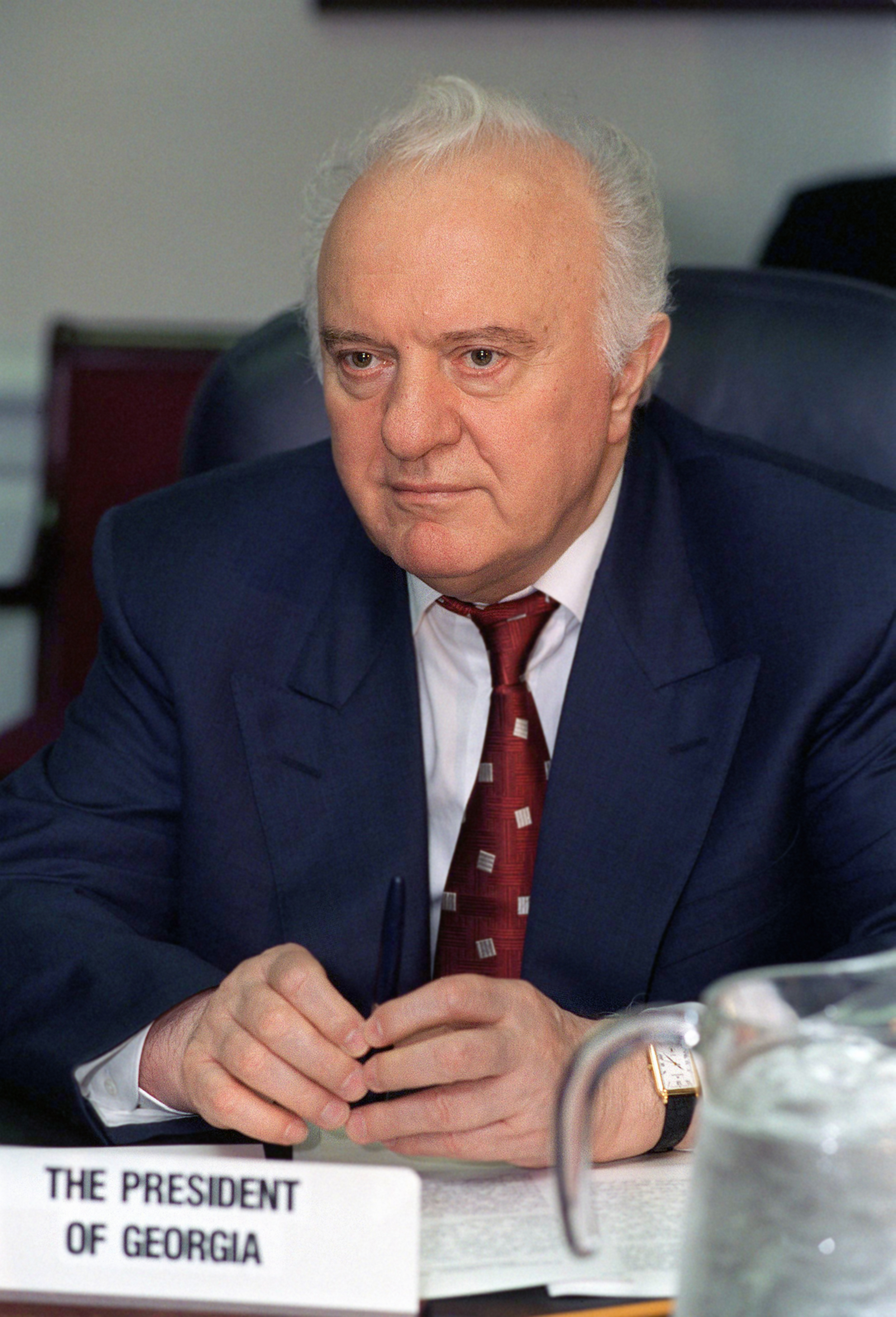
Eduard Shevardnadze

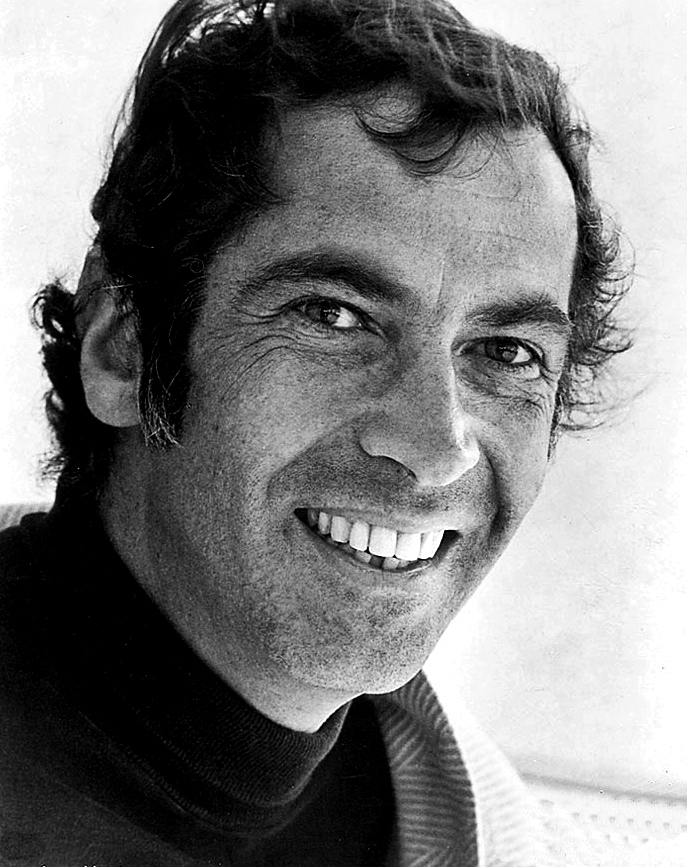
Roger Vadim

- January 1 – Abdul Sattar Edhi, Pakistani philanthropist (d. 2016)
- January 2 – Daisaku Ikeda, Japanese religious leader, 3rd President of Soka Gakkai (d. 2023)
- January 3 – Abdul Rahman Ya'kub, Malaysian politician (d. 2015)
- January 5
  - Zulfikar Ali Bhutto, President of Pakistan and Prime Minister of Pakistan (d. 1979)
  - Qian Qichen, Chinese diplomat, politician (d. 2017)
- January 6 – Vijay Tendulkar, Indian playwright (d. 2008)
- January 7 – William Peter Blatty, American writer (The Exorcist) (d. 2017)
- January 9
  - Judith Krantz, American novelist (d. 2019)
  - Domenico Modugno, Italian singer, songwriter, actor and politician (d. 1994)
- January 10 – Philip Levine, American poet (d. 2015)
- January 13 – Bengt Gustavsson, Swedish footballer and manager (d. 2017)
- January 14 – Hans Kornberg, German-English biochemist (d. 2019)
- January 16
  - William Kennedy, American author
  - Pilar Lorengar, Spanish soprano (d. 1996)
- January 17
  - Jean Barraqué, French composer (d. 1973)
  - Vidal Sassoon, English hairdresser (d. 2012)
- January 18 – Terence Higgins, Baron Higgins, English politician and athlete (d. 2025)
- January 21
  - Gene Sharp, American political theorist of nonviolent action (d. 2018)
  - Reynaldo Bignone, 45th President of Argentina (d. 2018)
- January 22 – Kate Molale, South African anti-apartheid activist (d. 1980)
- January 23 – Jeanne Moreau, French actress (d. 2017)
- January 24
  - Desmond Morris, English anthropologist and writer (d. 2026)
  - Michel Serrault, French actor (d. 2007)
- January 25 – Eduard Shevardnadze, Georgian politician, 2nd President of Georgia (d. 2014)
- January 26 – Roger Vadim, French film director (d. 2000)
- January 27 – Hans Modrow, East German Premier (d. 2023)
- January 30 – Harold Prince, American stage producer, director (d. 2019)

=== February ===
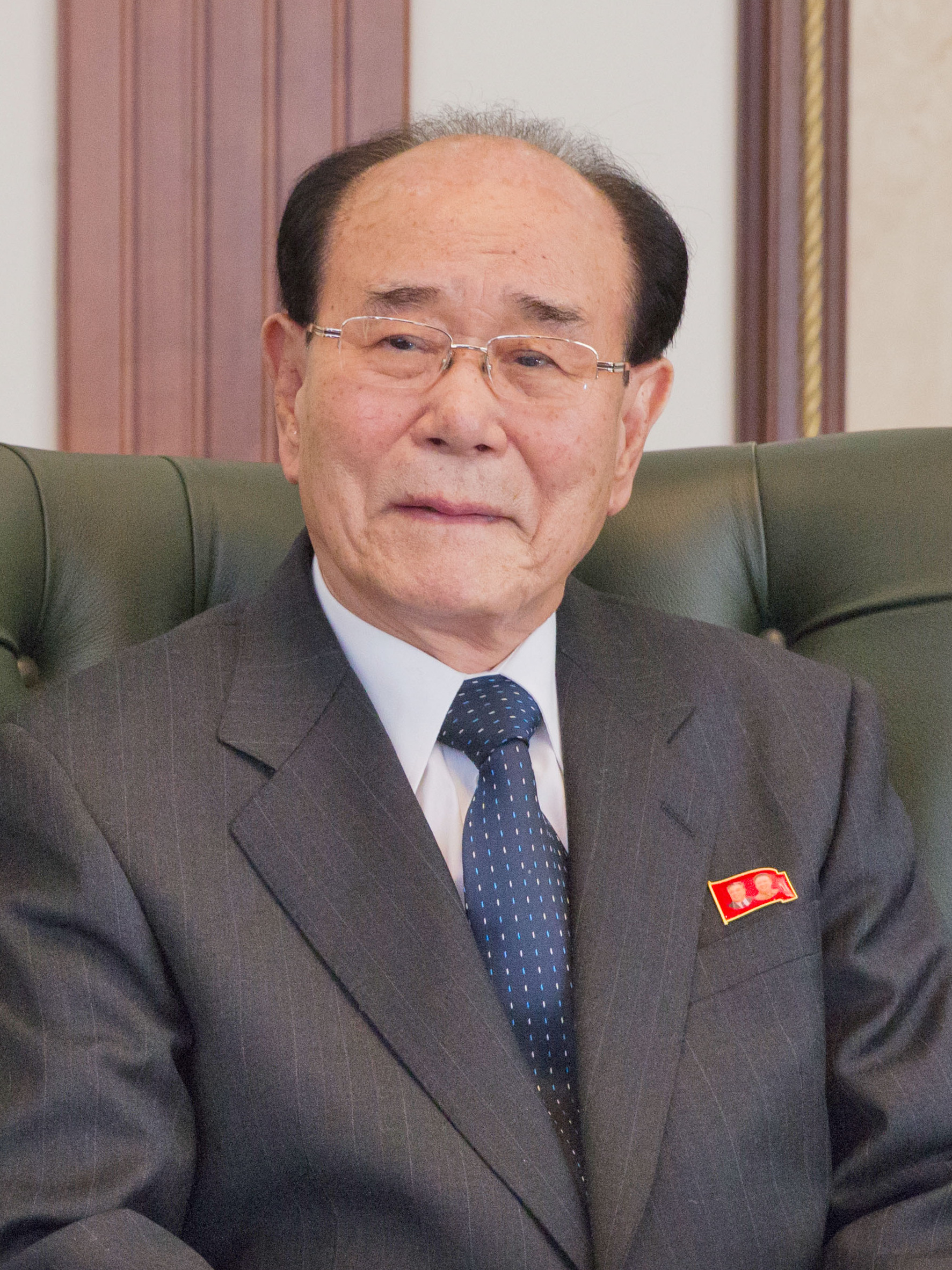
Kim Yong-nam

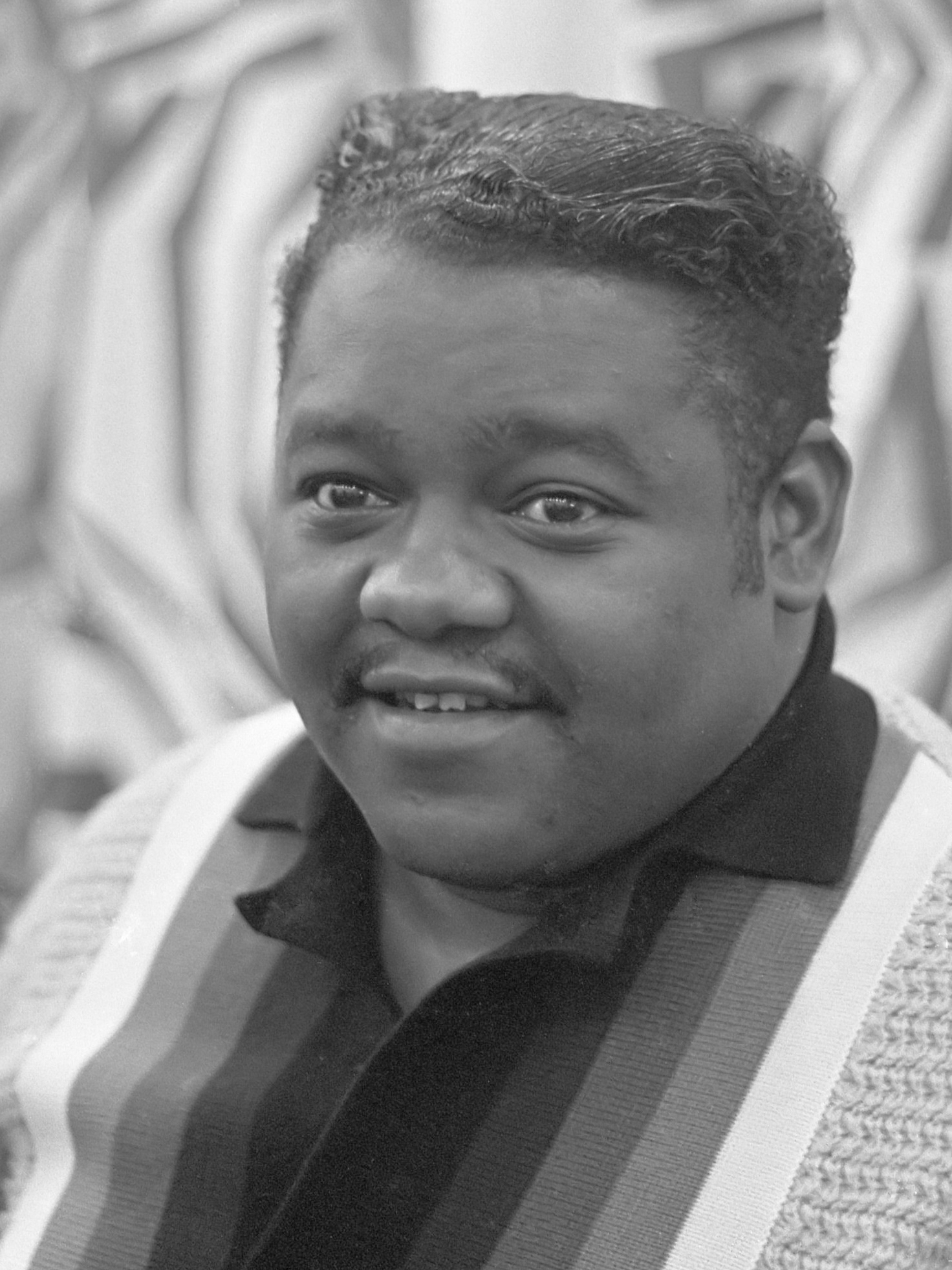
Fats Domino

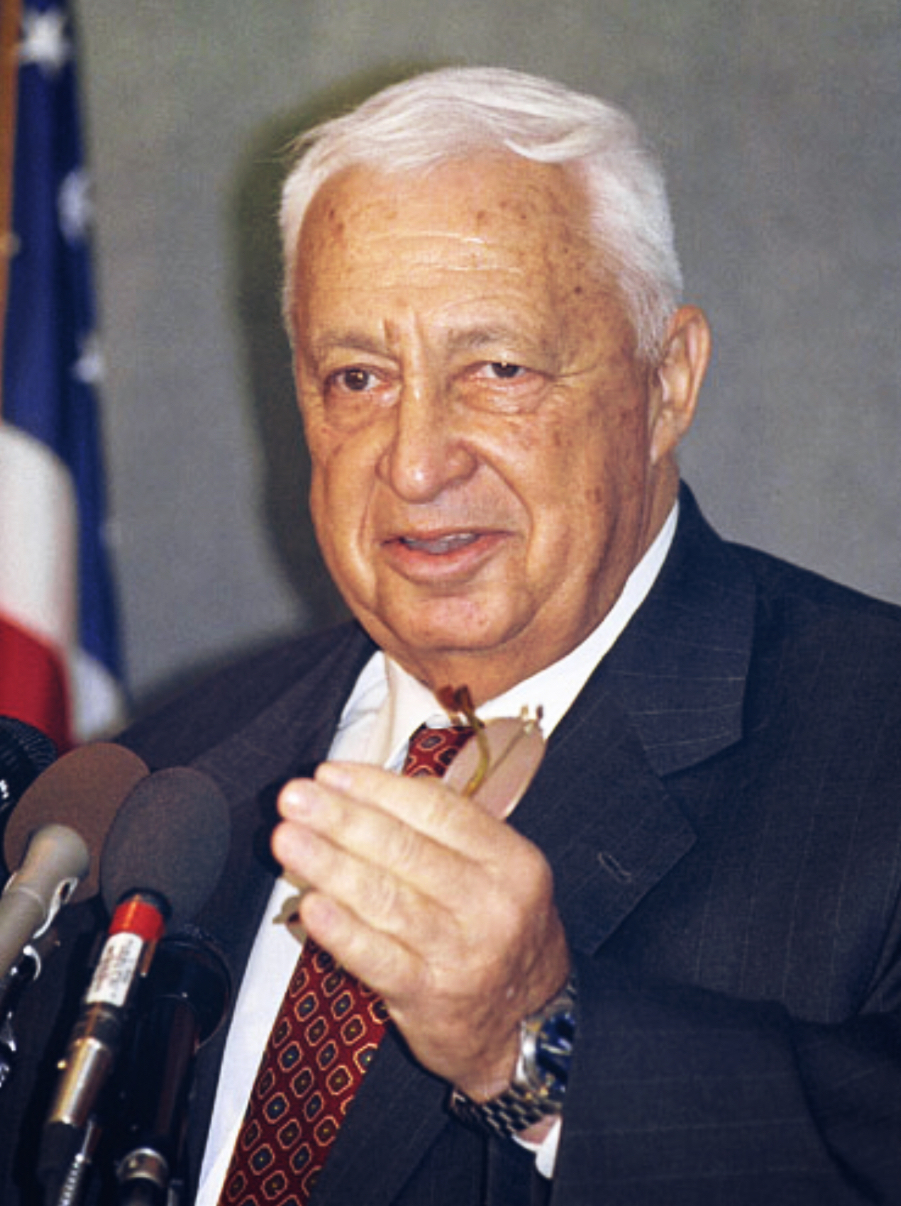
Ariel Sharon

- February 1 – Stuart Whitman, American actor (d. 2020)
- February 2 – Ciriaco De Mita, Italian politician (d. 2022)
- February 4 – Kim Yong-nam, North Korean politician (d. 2025)
- February 5 – Hristu Cândroveanu, Romanian editor, literary critic and writer (d. 2013)
- February 9
  - George Brady, Czech-Canadian businessman and Holocaust survivor (d. 2019)
  - Rinus Michels, Dutch association football player, coach (d. 2005)
  - John Warrack, English music critic
- February 13 – Gerald Regan, Canadian politician (d. 2019)
- February 15 – Luis Posada Carriles, Cuban militant (d. 2018)
- February 16 – Pedro Casaldáliga, Spanish-Brazilian prelate and human rights activist (d. 2020)
- February 18 – John Ostrom, American paleontologist (d. 2005)
- February 20 – Friedrich Wetter, German Catholic cardinal
- February 22
  - Sir Bruce Forsyth, English entertainer (d. 2017)
  - Pushpa Mittra Bhargava, Indian scientist, writer, and administrator (d. 2017)
- February 23 – Vasily Lazarev, Russian cosmonaut (d. 1990)
- February 24 – Naqsh Lyallpuri, Indian ghazal (d. 2017)
- February 25 – Paul Elvstrøm, Danish yachtsman (d. 2016)
- February 26
  - Fats Domino, African-American musician (d. 2017)
  - Anatoly Filipchenko, Russian cosmonaut (d. 2022)
  - Ariel Sharon, 11th Prime Minister of Israel (d. 2014)
- February 27 – René Clemencic, Austrian composer and conductor (d. 2022)
- February 28 – Stanley Baker, Welsh actor and film producer (d. 1976)

=== March ===
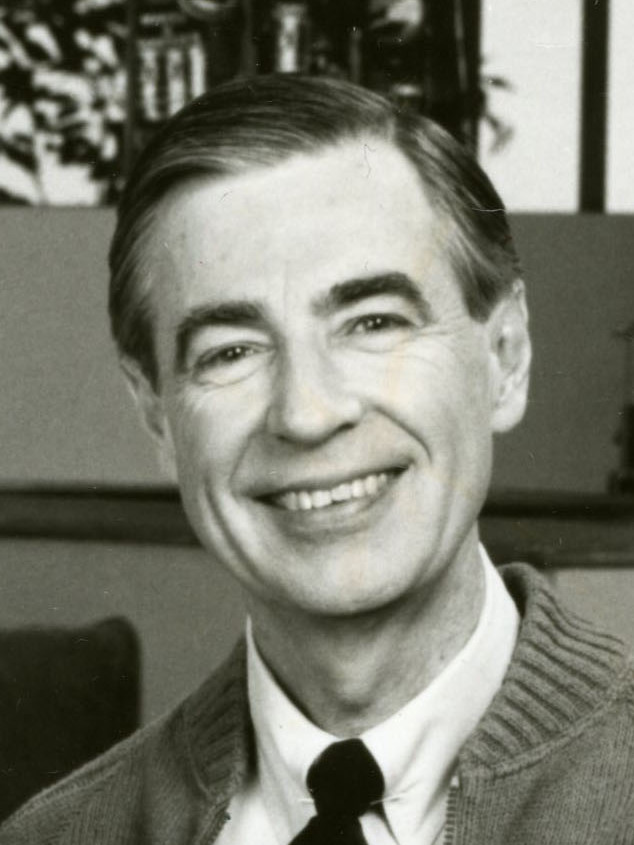
Fred Rogers

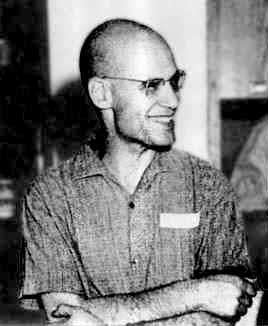
Alexander Grothendieck

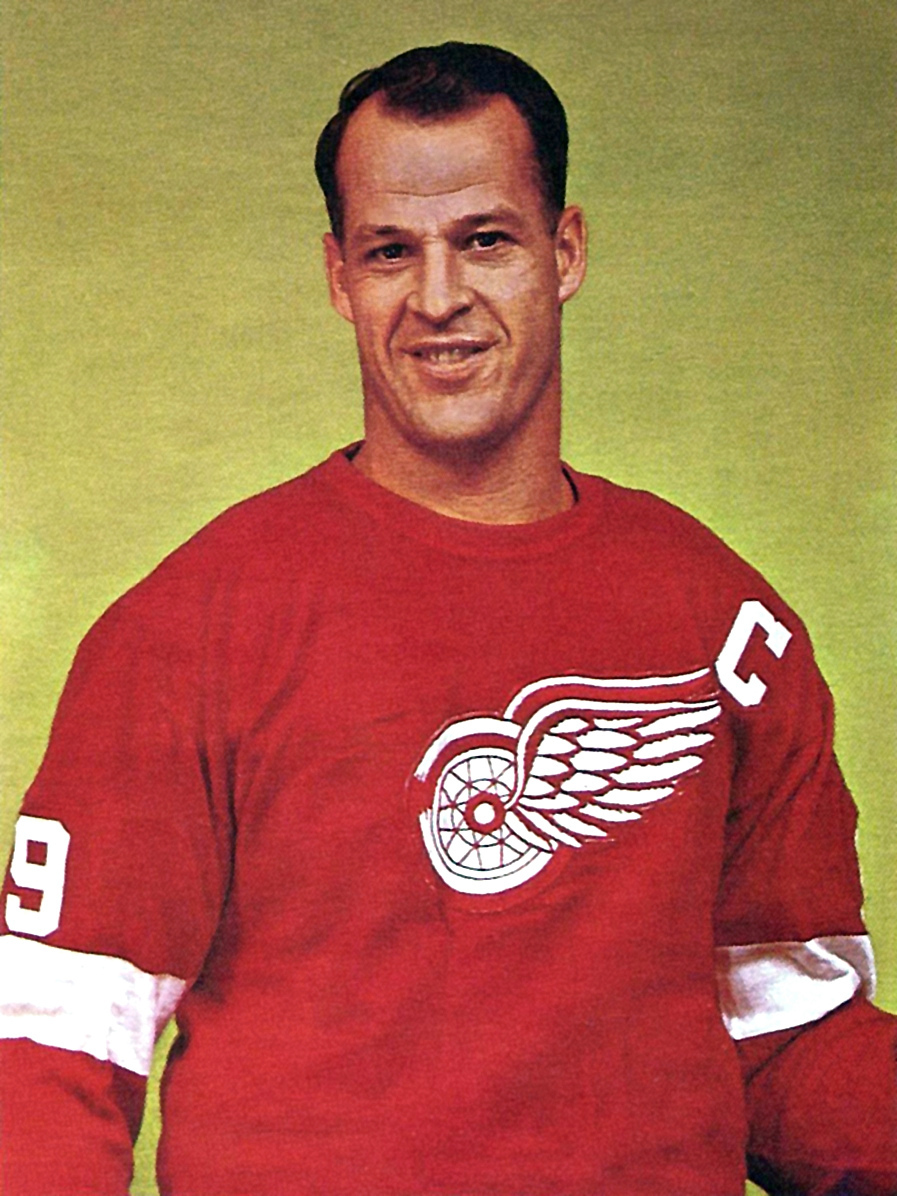
Gordie Howe

- March 1 – Jacques Rivette, French filmmaker (d. 2016)
- March 3
  - Bernice Sandler, American women's rights activist (d. 2019)
  - Gudrun Pausewang, German young fiction writer (d. 2020)
- March 4 – Alan Sillitoe, English writer (d. 2010)
- March 5 – Yelizaveta Dementyeva, Soviet Olympic canoeist (d. 2022)
- March 7 – Arthur Dion Hanna, Bahamian politician (d. 2021)
- March 9
  - Gerald Bull, Canadian engineer (d. 1990)
  - Robert Adeyinka Adebayo, Nigerian politician and military officer (d. 2017)
- March 10
  - Sara Montiel, Spanish singer, actress (d. 2013)
  - James Earl Ray, American assassin (d. 1998)
- March 12 – Edward Albee, American dramatist (d. 2016)
- March 14 – Frank Borman, American astronaut (d. 2023)
- March 16
  - Karlheinz Böhm, Austrian actor (d. 2014)
  - Christa Ludwig, German mezzo-soprano (d. 2021)
- March 18
  - Lennart Carleson, Swedish mathematician
  - Fidel V. Ramos, 12th President of the Philippines (d. 2022)
- March 19
  - Sutanto Djuhar, Chinese-Indonesian entrepreneur (d. 2018)
  - Hans Küng, Swiss Roman Catholic theologian (d. 2021)
  - Marceline Loridan-Ivens, French writer, film director and Holocaust survivor (d. 2018)
  - Patrick McGoohan, American-born British-based actor of Irish descent (d. 2009)
- March 20 – Fred Rogers, American children's television host (d. 2003)
- March 21 – Surya Bahadur Thapa, 24th Prime Minister of Nepal (d. 2015)
- March 25 – Jim Lovell, American astronaut (d. 2025)
- March 28
  - Zbigniew Brzezinski, Polish-born American National Security Advisor (d. 2017)
  - Alexander Grothendieck, German-born French mathematician (d. 2014)
- March 30 – Robert Badinter, French lawyer and politician (d. 2024)
- March 31
  - Lefty Frizzell, American country music performer (d. 1975)
  - Gordie Howe, Canadian hockey player (d. 2016)

=== April ===
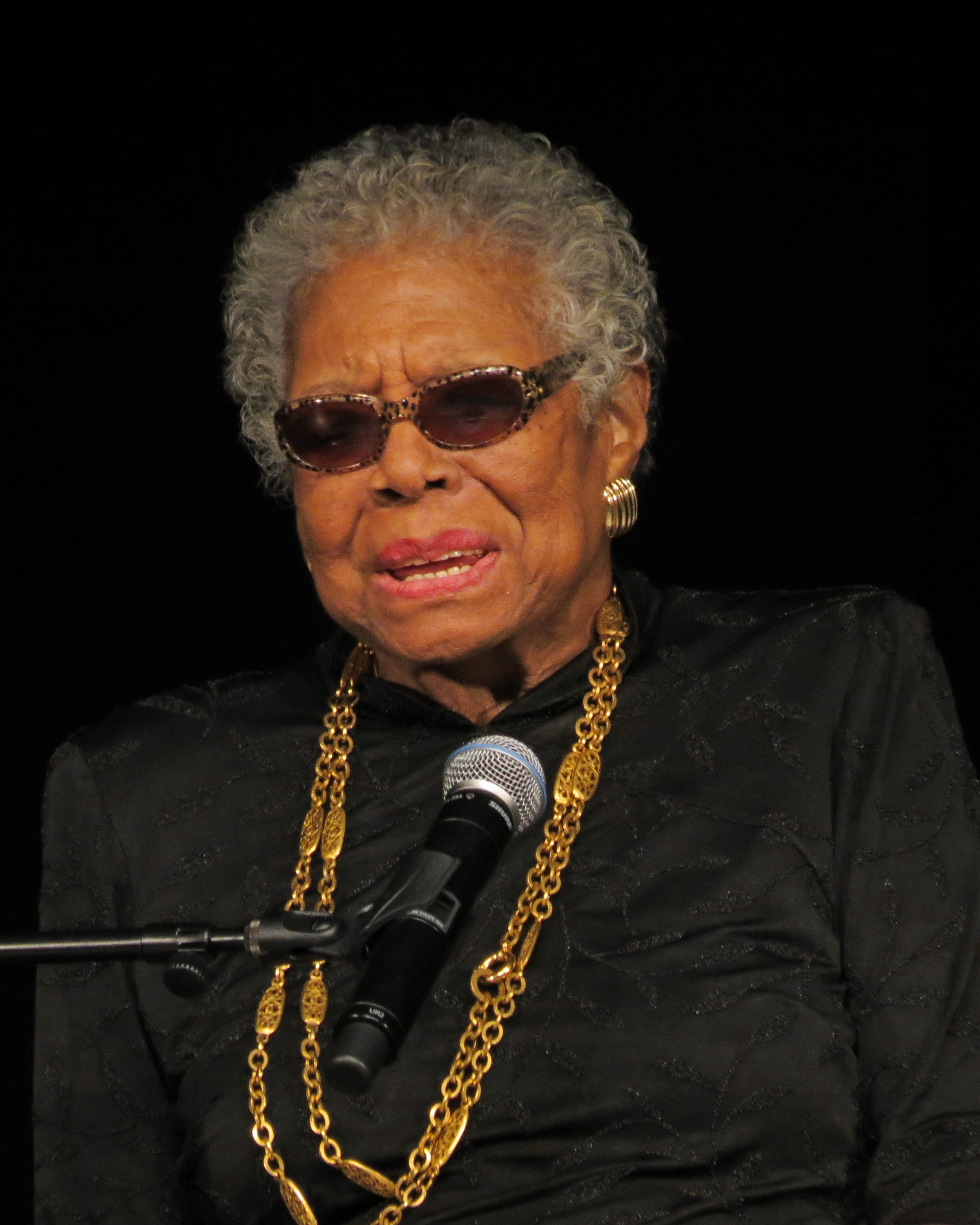
Maya Angelou

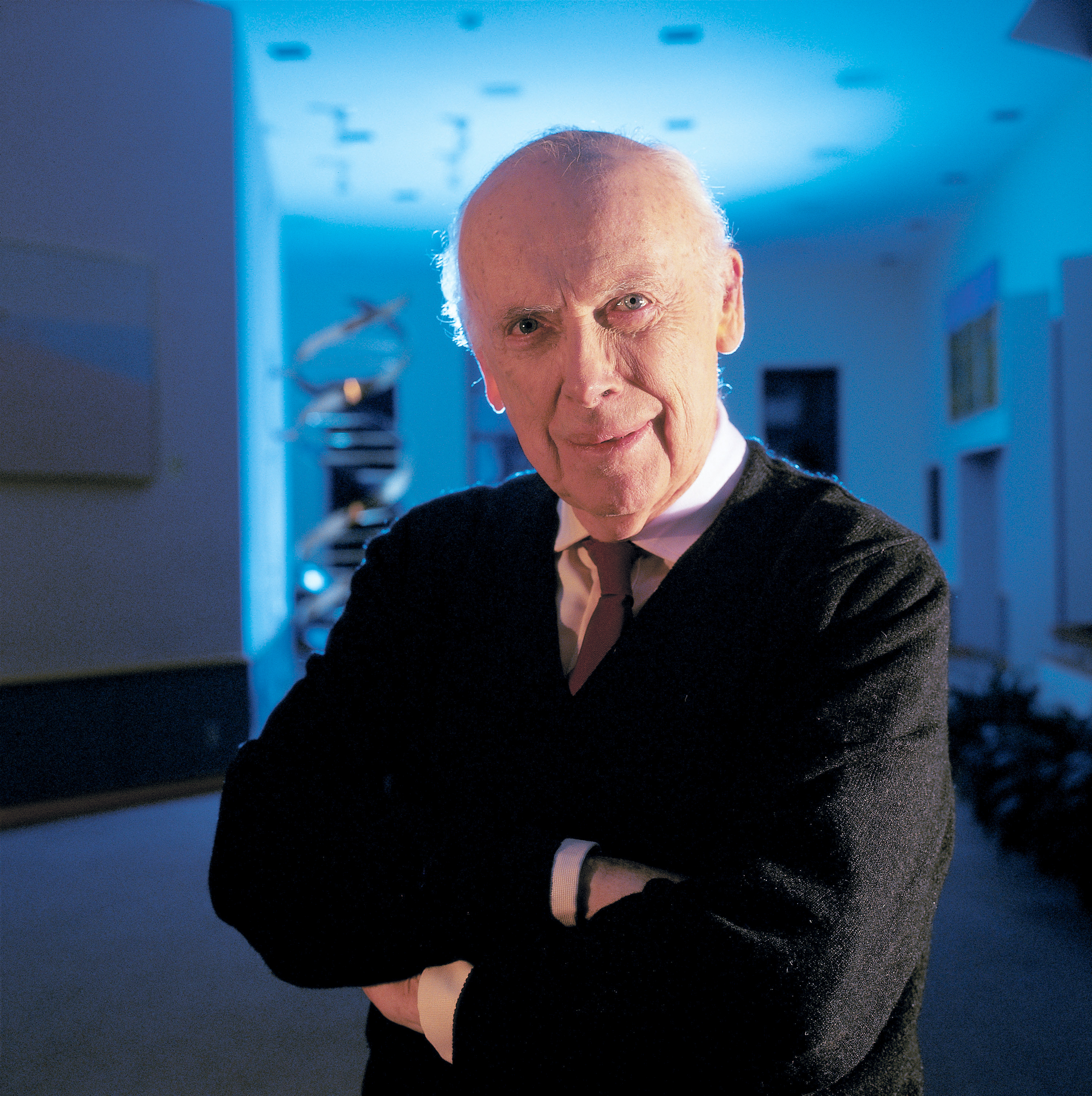
James D. Watson

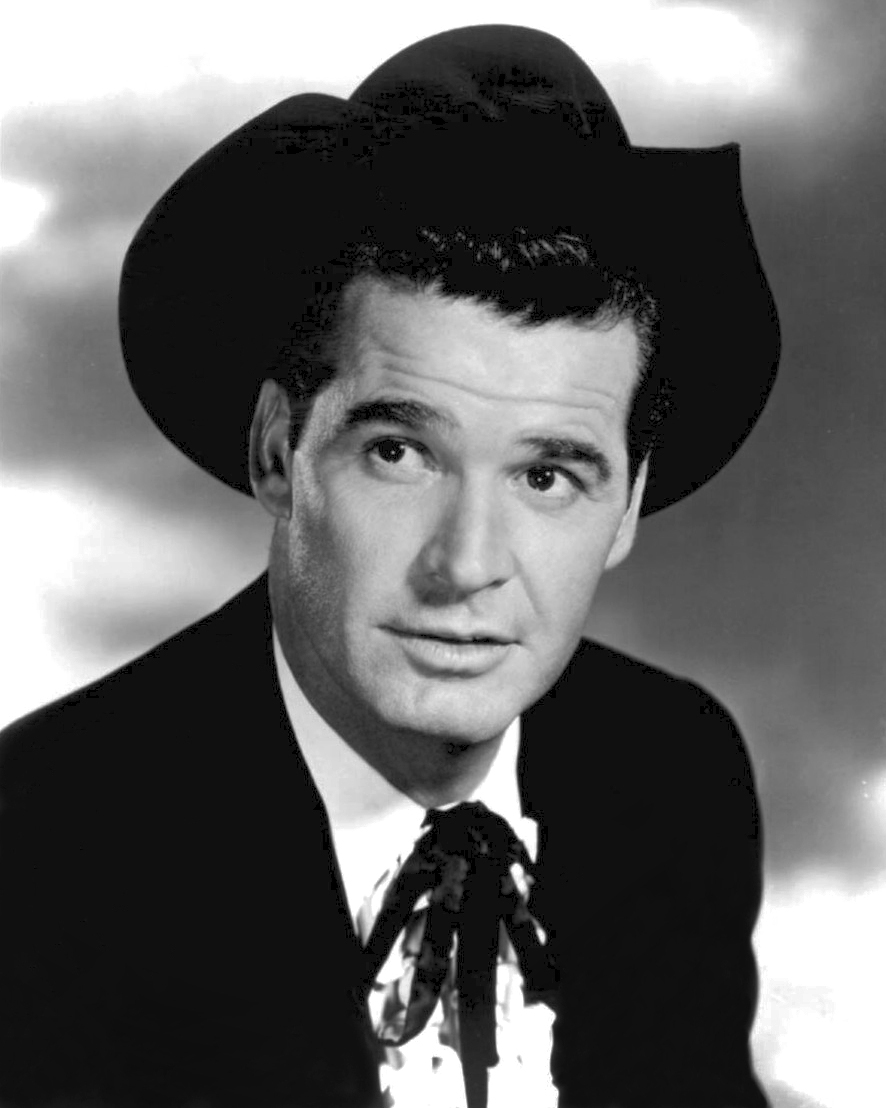
James Garner

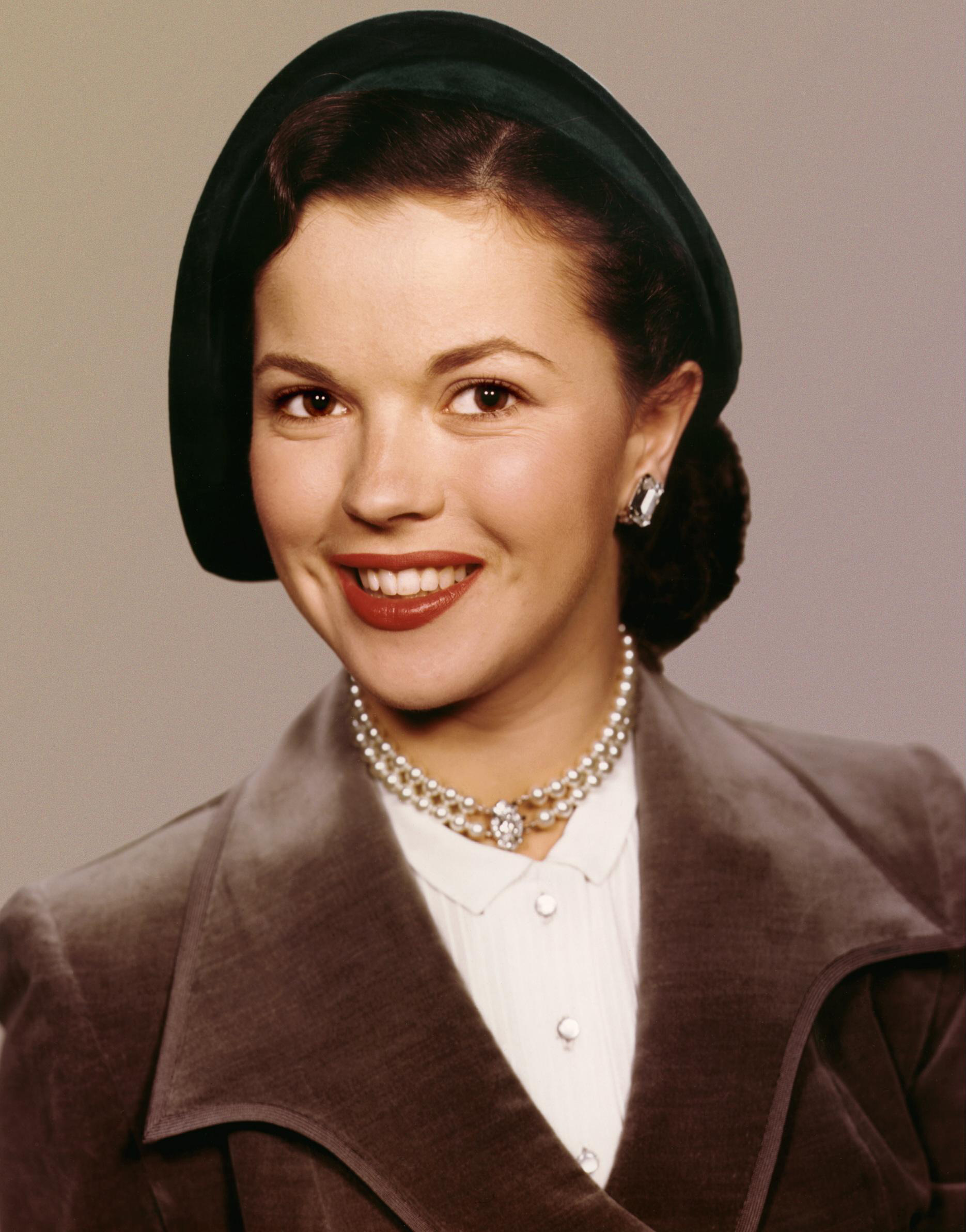
Shirley Temple

- April 2 - Joseph Bernardin, American Catholic prelate, Archbishop of Cincinnati, Cardinal Archbishop of Chicago (d. 1996)
- April 2 – Serge Gainsbourg, French singer (d. 1991)
- April 3 – Don Gibson, American country music singer-songwriter (d. 2003)
- April 4 – Maya Angelou, African-American poet, novelist (d. 2014)
- April 6 – James D. Watson, American geneticist; recipient of the Nobel Prize in Physiology or Medicine (d. 2025)
- April 7
  - James Garner, American actor, producer (d. 2014)
  - Alan J. Pakula, American producer, director (d. 1998)
- April 8 – Eric Porter, English actor (d. 1995)
- April 9
  - Paul Arizin, American basketball player (d. 2006)
  - Tom Lehrer, American songwriter, satirist (d. 2025)
- April 11 – Ethel Kennedy, American human-rights campaigner, wife of Robert F. Kennedy (d. 2024)
- April 12 – Hardy Krüger, German actor (d. 2022)
- April 15 – Vida Alves, Brazilian actress (d. 2017)
- April 18 – Mikio Sato, Japanese mathematician (d. 2023)
- April 19 – Sultan Azlan Shah of Perak, King of Malaysia (d. 2014)
- April 23 – Shirley Temple, American actress and diplomat (d. 2014)
- April 24 – Tommy Docherty, Scottish footballer and manager (d. 2020)
- April 25 – Cy Twombly, American artist (d. 2011)
- April 28 – Yves Klein, French artist (d. 1962)

=== May ===
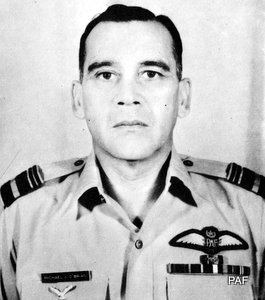
Michael John O'Brian

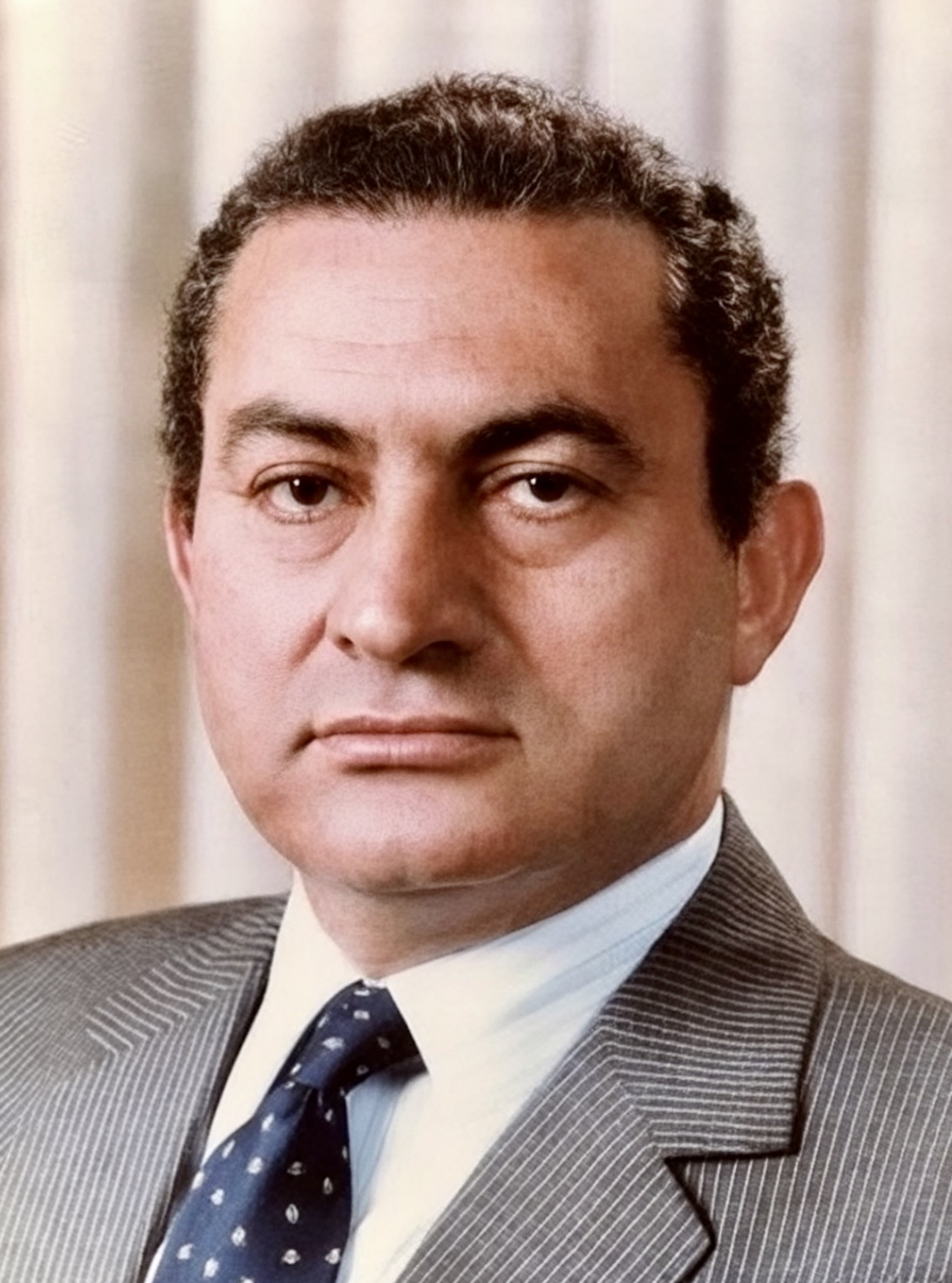
Hosni Mubarak

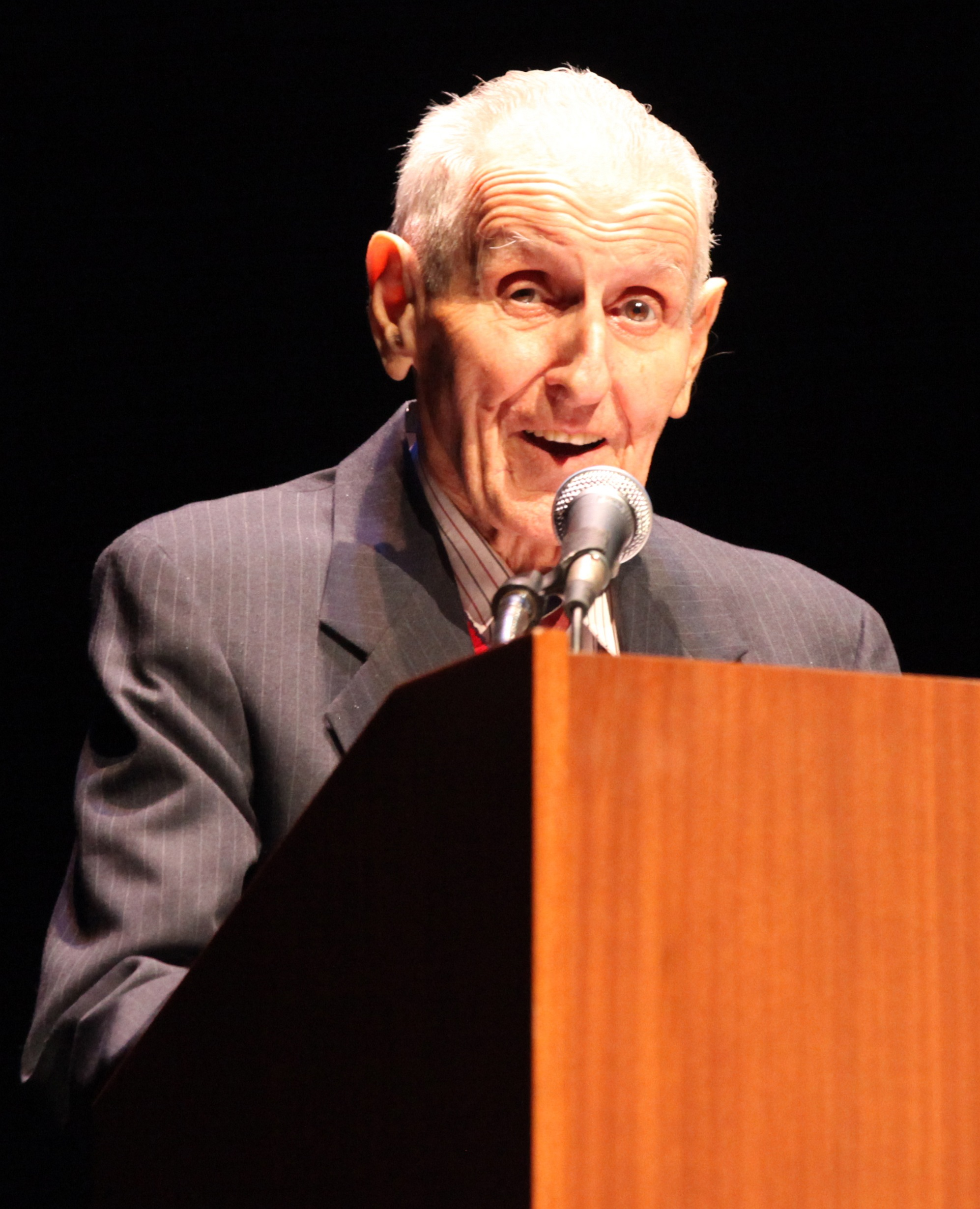
Jack Kevorkian

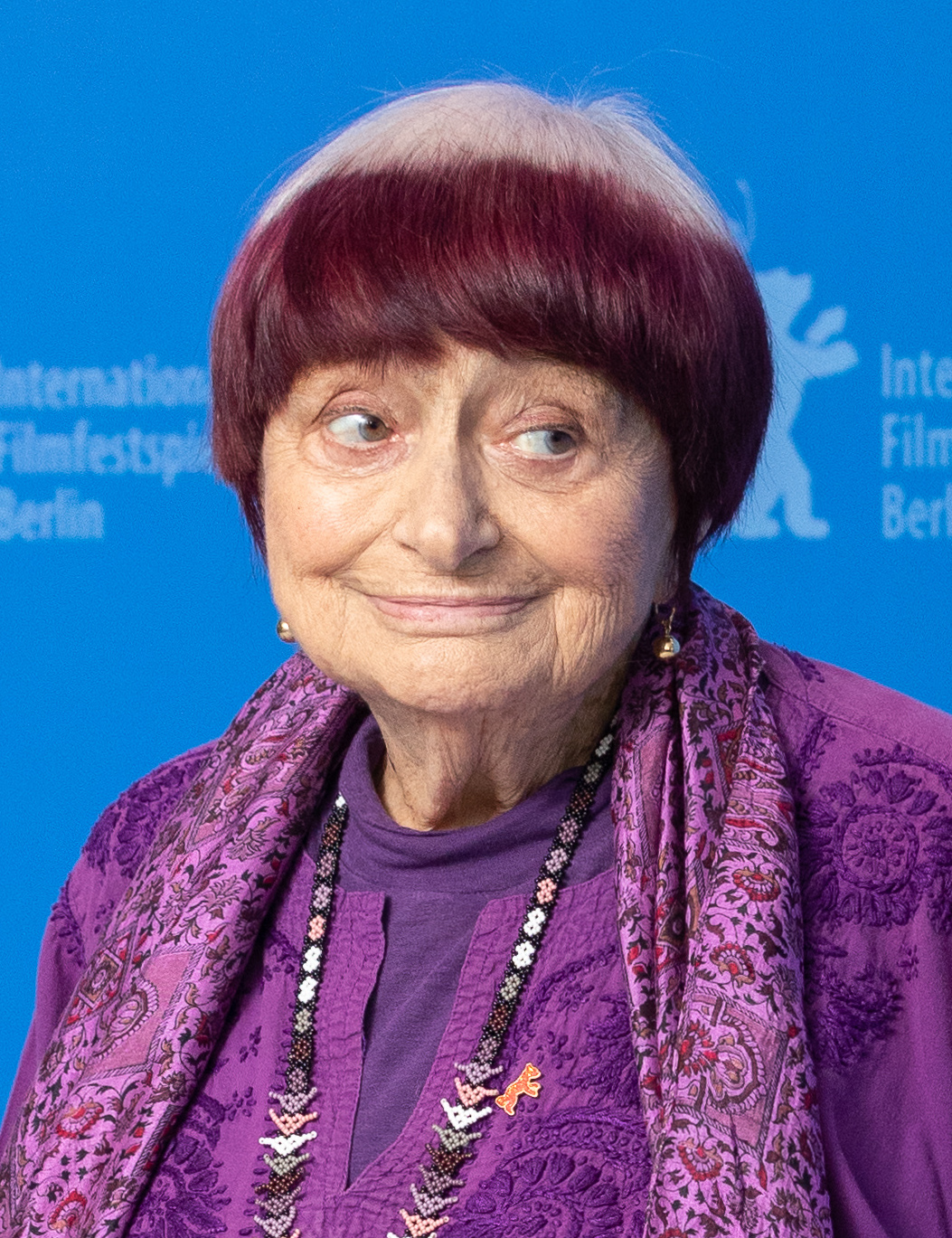
Agnès Varda

- May 1
  - Michael John O'Brian, Irish-Pakistani Air Vice Marshal (d. 1998)
  - Sonny James, American country singer (d. 2016)
  - Sisavath Keobounphanh, 13th prime minister of Laos (d. 2020)
- May 4
  - Maynard Ferguson, Canadian jazz trumpeter (d. 2006)
  - Hosni Mubarak, 4th President of Egypt (d. 2020)
  - Betsy Rawls, American golfer (d. 2023)
  - Wolfgang von Trips, German racing driver (d. 1961)
- May 9
  - Pancho Gonzales, American tennis player (d. 1995)
  - Barbara Ann Scott, Canadian figure skater (d. 2012)
- May 10
  - Arnold Rüütel, President of Estonia (d. 2024)
  - Lothar Schmid, German chess player (d. 2013)
- May 11
  - Arthur Foulkes, Governor-General of the Bahamas
  - Andrew van der Bijl, Dutch Christian missionary (d. 2022)
- May 12 – Burt Bacharach, American composer, songwriter and pianist (d. 2023)
- May 13
  - Enrique Bolaños, 61st President of Nicaragua (d. 2021)
  - Édouard Molinaro, French film director, screenwriter (d. 2013)
- May 16 – Billy Martin, American baseball player (d. 1989)
- May 18 – Pernell Roberts, American actor (d. 2010)
- May 19
  - Dolph Schayes, American basketball player (d. 2015)
  - Dragutin Zelenović, Serbian politician and professor (d. 2020)
- May 23 – Rosemary Clooney, American singer and actress (d. 2002)
- May 24 – Adrian Frutiger, Swiss typeface designer, cutter (d. 2015)
- May 26 – Jack Kevorkian, American right-to-die advocate (d. 2011)
- May 27 – Thea Musgrave, Scottish-born American composer and educator
- May 28 – Ivan Kizimov, Soviet and Russian equestrian (d. 2019)
- May 30 – Agnès Varda, Belgian-born French director, producer and screenwriter (d. 2019)

=== June ===
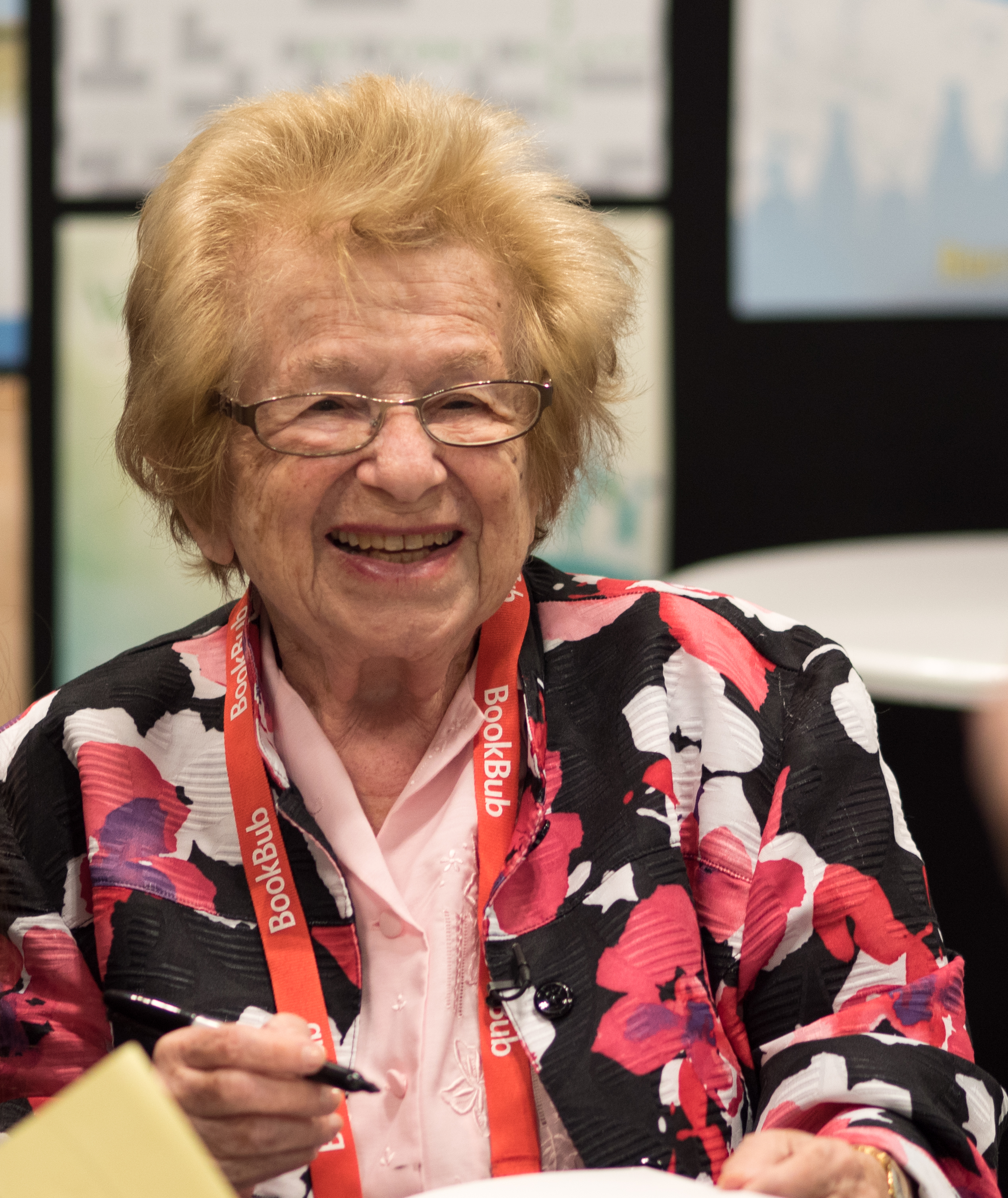
Ruth Westheimer

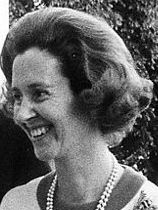
Queen Fabiola of Belgium

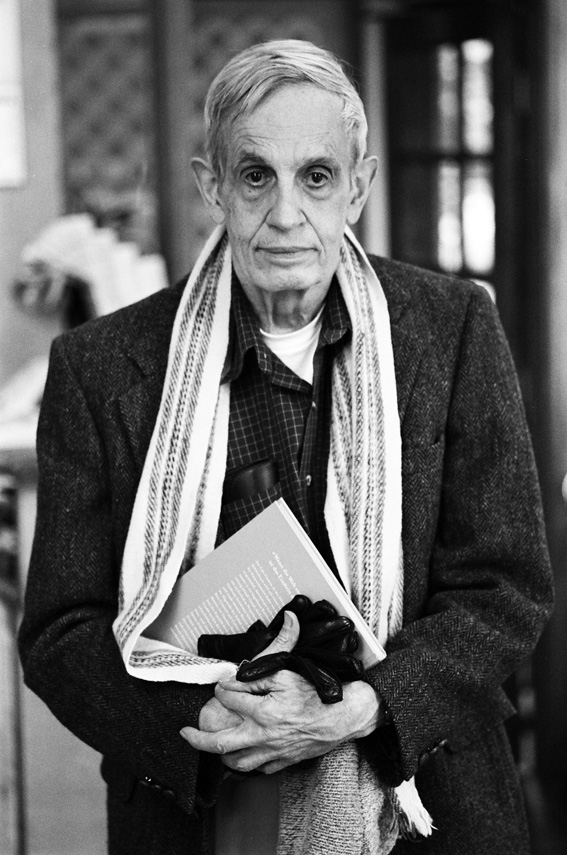
John Forbes Nash Jr.

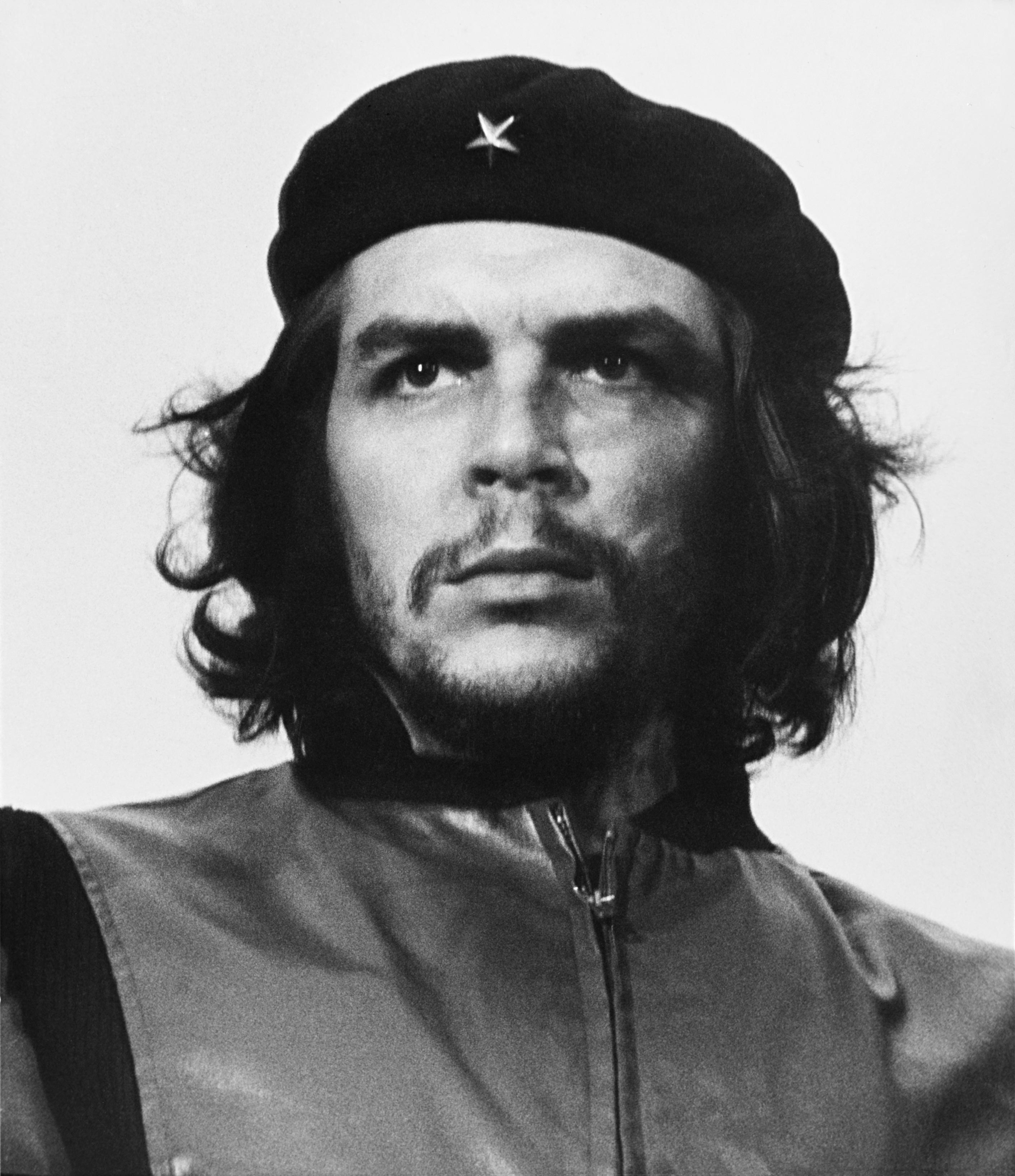
Che Guevara

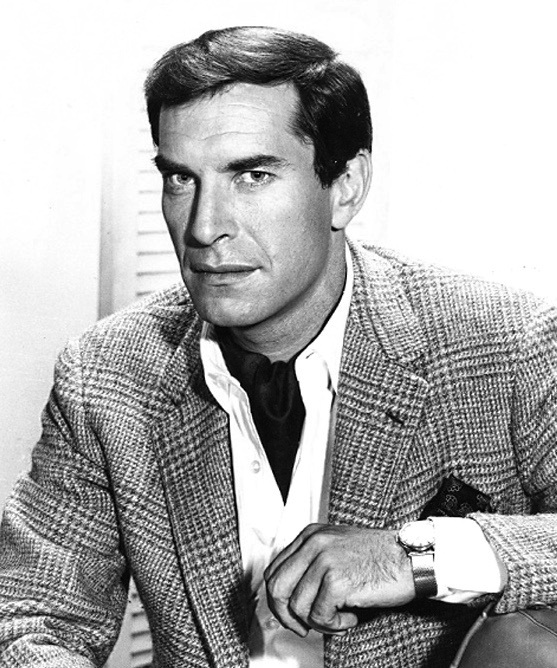
Martin Landau

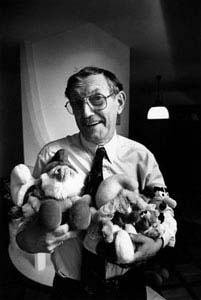
Peyo

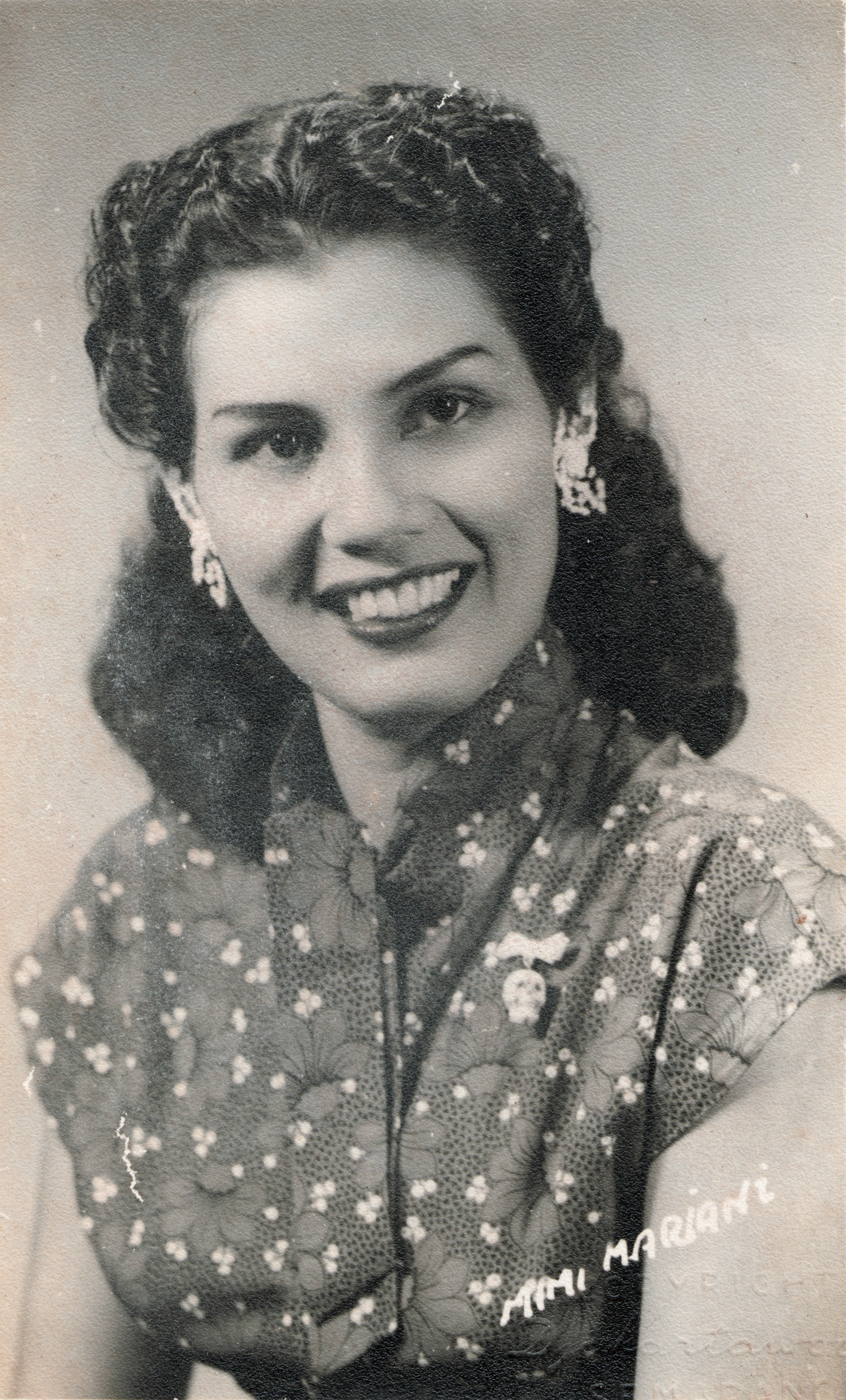
Mimi Mariani

- June 3
  - Donald Judd, American artist (d. 1994)
  - John Richard Reid, New Zealand cricketer (d. 2020)
- June 4 – Ruth Westheimer (Dr. Ruth), German-American sex therapist, film and television personality, and author (d. 2024)
- June 5 – Tony Richardson, English film and theatre director (d. 1991)
- June 6 – George Deukmejian, American Republican politician (d. 2018)
- June 7
  - James Ivory, American director, screenwriter and producer
  - Charles Strouse, American composer and lyricist (d. 2025)
- June 8 – Mimi Mariani, Indonesian actress, model, and singer (d. 1971)
- June 10 – Maurice Sendak, American children's author, illustrator (d. 2012)
- June 11 – Queen Fabiola of Belgium, Spanish Queen Consort of King Baudouin of Belgium (d. 2014)
- June 12
  - Vic Damone, American singer (d. 2018)
  - Richard M. Sherman, American songwriter (d. 2024)
- June 13
  - Giacomo Biffi, Italian Catholic cardinal (d. 2015)
  - John Forbes Nash Jr., American mathematician, recipient of the Nobel Prize in Economics (d. 2015)
  - Li Ka-shing, Asia's & Hong Kong's richest person, major philanthropist
- June 14
  - José Bonaparte, Argentine palaeontologist (d. 2020)
  - Che Guevara, Argentine-born Cuban revolutionary (or May 14; d. 1967)
- June 16
  - Annie Cordy, Belgian actress and singer (d. 2020)
  - Dagmar Rom, Austrian alpine skier (d. 2022)
- June 17 – Juan María Bordaberry, Uruguayan dictator (d. 2011)
- June 19
  - Tommy DeVito, American musician and singer (The Four Seasons) (d. 2020)
  - Jacques Dupont, French Olympic cyclist (d. 2019)
- June 20
  - Martin Landau, American actor (d. 2017)
  - Jean-Marie Le Pen, French intelligence officer, far-right politician (d. 2025)
- June 22 – Ralph Waite, American actor, political activist (The Waltons) (d. 2014)
- June 25
  - Alexei Alexeyevich Abrikosov, Russian physicist, Nobel Prize laureate (d. 2017)
  - Peyo, Belgian comics artist (d. 1992)
- June 27
  - Lin Ho-ming, Taiwanese sports shooter
  - Antoinette Spaak, Belgian politician (d. 2020)
  - Joe Wirkkunen, Finnish-Canadian ice hockey coach (d. 1986)
- June 28
  - Hans Blix, Swedish diplomat and politician
  - Harold Evans, English-born newspaper editor (d. 2020)

=== July ===
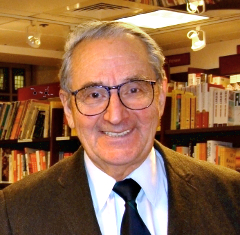
Elias James Corey

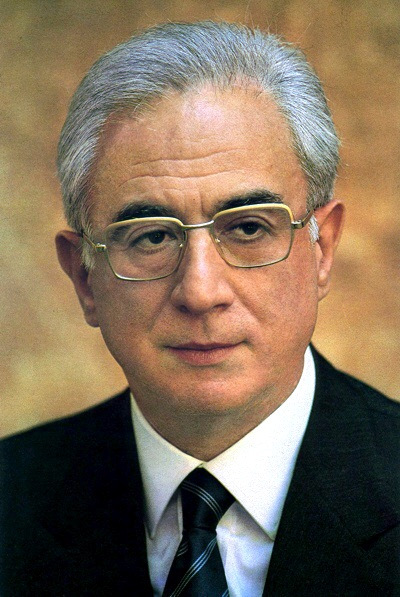
Francesco Cossiga

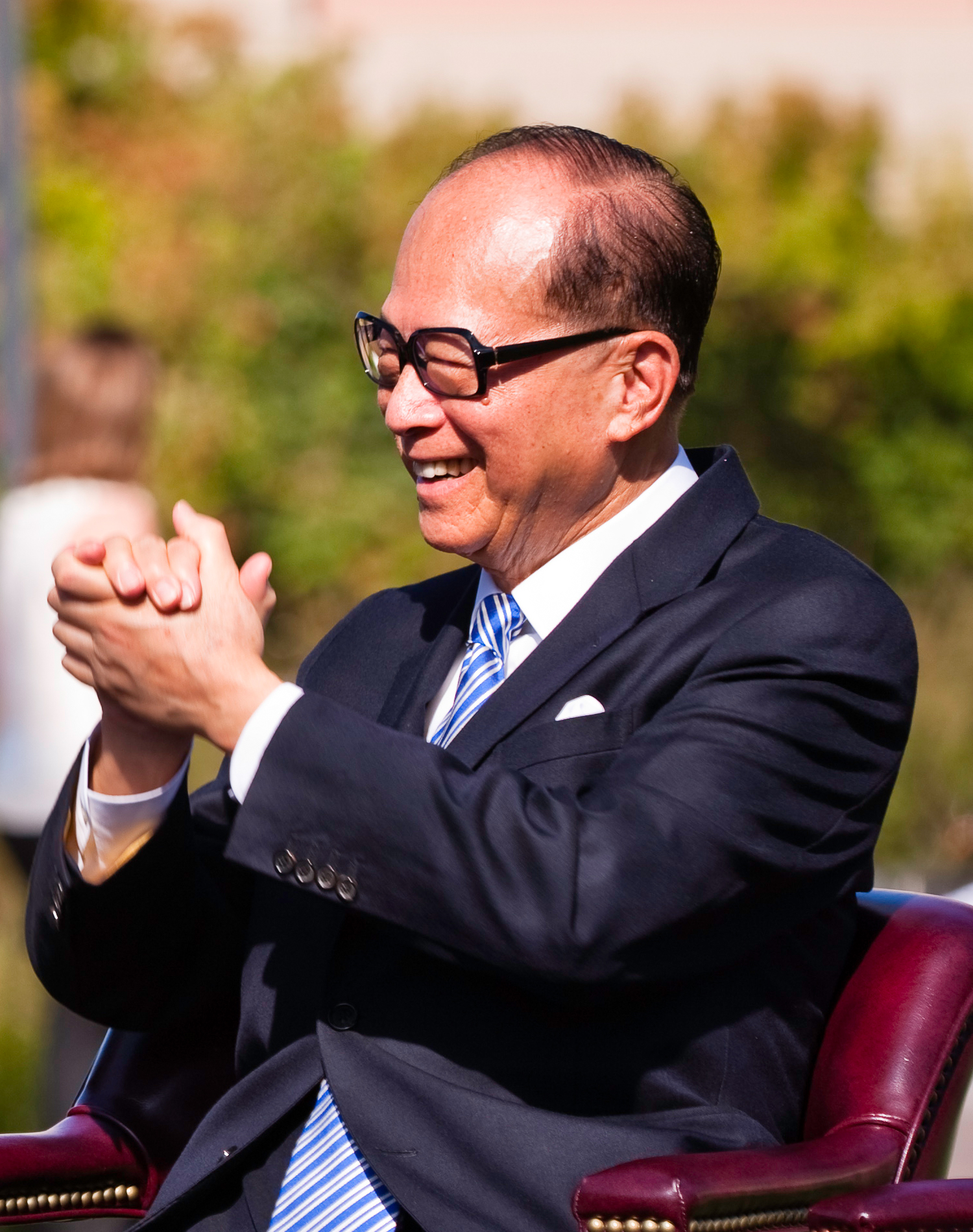
Li Ka-shing

- July 4
  - Giampiero Boniperti, Italian football player (d. 2021)
  - Teofisto Guingona Jr., 13th Vice President of the Philippines
- July 5
  - Juris Hartmanis, Latvian-born American computer scientist, computational theorist (d. 2022)
  - Pierre Mauroy, Prime Minister of France (d. 2013)
- July 8
  - Balakh Sher Mazari, Pakistani politician, caretaker prime minister (d. 2022)
  - Alekos Spanoudakis, Greek basketball player (d. 2019)
- July 9 – Federico Bahamontes, Spanish road bicycle racer (d. 2023)
- July 11
  - Carmelita González, Mexican actress (d. 2010)
  - Greville Janner, British lawyer and Labour Member of Parliament (d. 2015)
- July 12
  - Elias James Corey, American chemist, Nobel Prize laureate
  - Hayden White, American historian (d. 2018)
- July 14 – Nancy Olson, American actress
- July 15 – Pal Benko, French chess grandmaster, author, and composer of endgame studies and chess problems (d. 2019)
- July 16
  - Anita Brookner, English novelist, art historian (d. 2016)
  - Jim Rathmann, American race car driver (d. 2011)
- July 19 – Choi Yun-chil, South Korean long-distance runner (d. 2020)
- July 20
  - Belaid Abdessalam, Algerian politician, Prime Minister 1992–93 (d. 2020)
  - Pavel Kohout, Czech-Austrian novelist, playwright, and poet
- July 23
  - Leon Fleisher, American pianist and conductor (d. 2020)
  - Vera Rubin, American astronomer (d. 2016)
- July 24 – Keshubhai Patel, Indian politician (d. 2020)
- July 25 – Dolphy, Filipino actor, comedian (d. 2012)
- July 26
  - Francesco Cossiga, Italian politician, 8th President of Italy (d. 2010)
  - Joe Jackson, American manager (d. 2018)
  - Stanley Kubrick, American film director (2001: A Space Odyssey) (d. 1999)
- July 27 – Joseph Kittinger, American colonel, U.S. Air Force pilot (d. 2022)
- July 29
  - T. H. P. Chentharasseri, Indian historian (d. 2018)
  - Li Ka-shing, Hong Kong billionaire

=== August ===
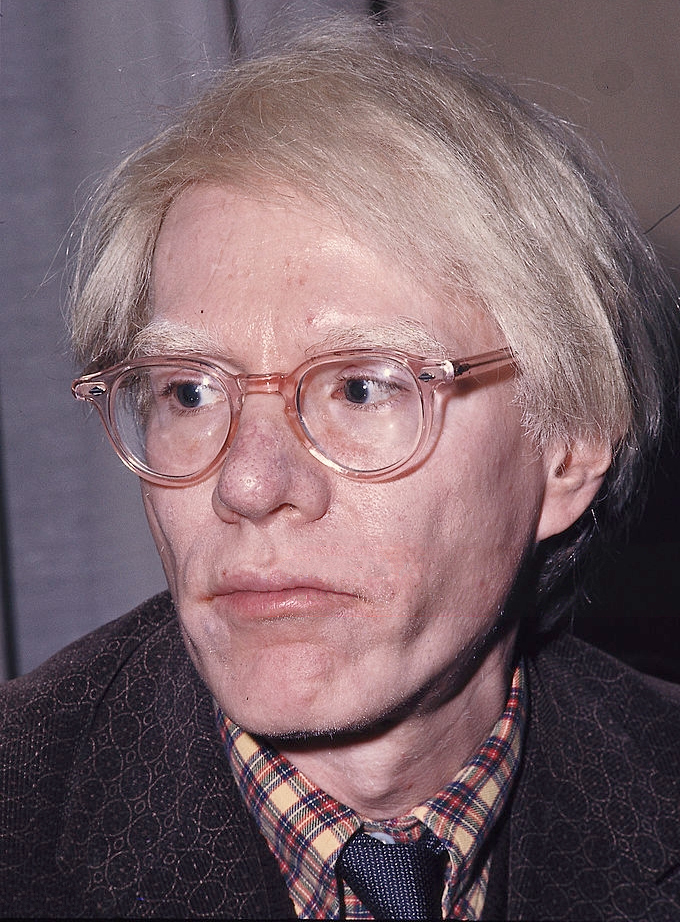
Andy Warhol

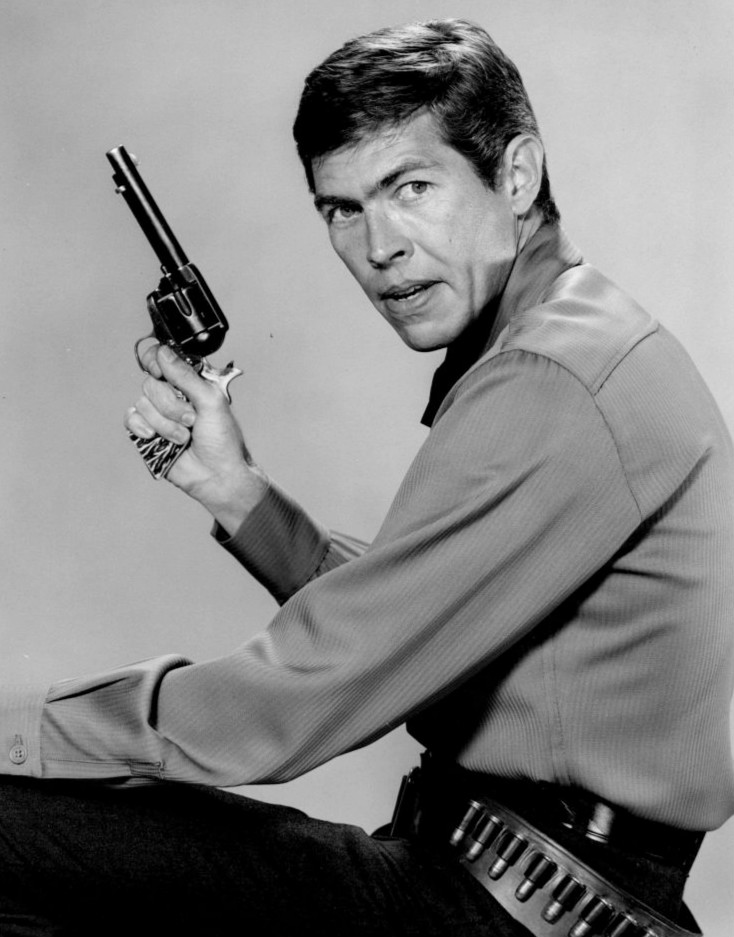
James Coburn

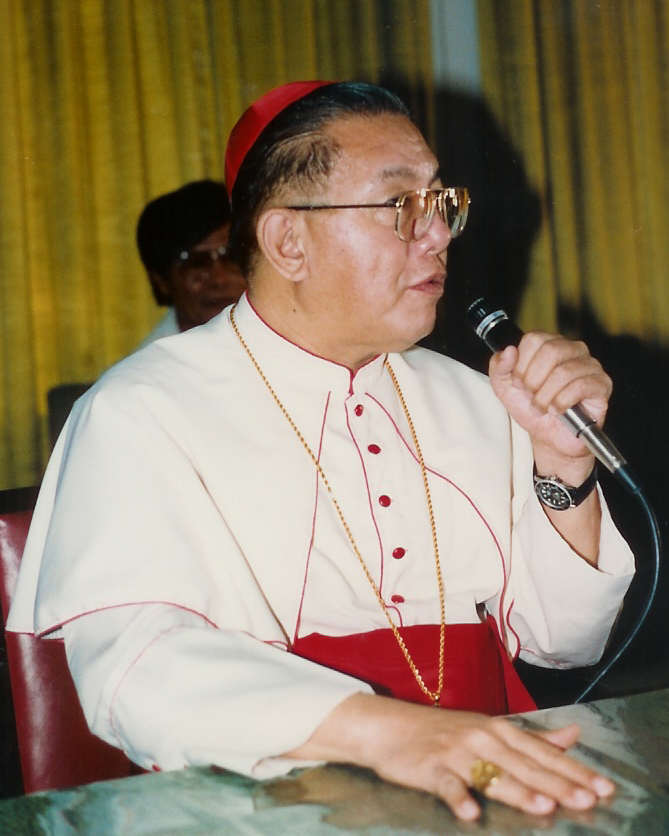
Jaime Sin

- August 2 – Luigi Colani, German industrial designer (d. 2019)
- August 3 – Cécile Aubry, French film actress, author, television screenwriter and director (d. 2010)
- August 4
  - Udham Singh, Indian field hockey player, winner of three gold and one silver medals (d. 2000)
  - Flóra Kádár, Hungarian actress (d. 2002)
  - Gerard Damiano, American adult film director (d. 2008)
- August 5 – Chung Won-shik, South Korean politician, educator, soldier, and author, prime minister 1991 (d. 2020)
- August 6
  - Mary Grant, Ghanaian politician (d. 2016)
  - Andy Warhol, American artist (d. 1987)
- August 7
  - Helen Vita, Swiss chanson singer, actress, and comedian (d. 2001)
  - James Randi, Canadian stage magician and scientific skeptic (d. 2020)
- August 8
  - Lubor Bárta, Czech composer (d. 1972)
  - Simón Díaz, Venezuelan folk composer, singer (d. 2014)
- August 10
  - Peter Barry, Irish Fine Gael politician, businessman (d. 2016)
  - Eddie Fisher, American singer and actor (d. 2010)
  - Jimmy Dean, singer, television host and spokesman for the Jimmy Dean sausage brand (d. 2010)
- August 11 – Beniamino Andreatta, Italian economist, politician (d. 2007)
- August 14 – Lina Wertmüller, Italian film director and screenwriter (d. 2021)
- August 15
  - Muhammad Haji Ibrahim Egal, two-time prime minister of Somalia (d. 2002)
  - Nicolas Roeg, English film director (d. 2018)
  - Simone Silva, Egyptian-born French film actress (d. 1957)
- August 16
  - Ara Güler, Armenian-Turkish photojournalist (d. 2018)
  - Eydie Gormé, American singer (d. 2013)
- August 19 – Queen Ratna of Nepal
- August 21
  - Chris Brasher, British track-and-field athlete, sports journalist and co-founder of the London Marathon (d. 2003)
  - Art Farmer, American jazz trumpeter, flugelhorn player (d. 1999)
  - Gillian Sheen, English Olympic fencer (d. 2021)
- August 22 – Karlheinz Stockhausen, German composer (d. 2007)
- August 23 – Marian Seldes, American actress (d. 2014)
- August 24 – Levko Lukyanenko, Ukrainian politician (d. 2018)
- August 25 – Herbert Kroemer, German-born physicist, Nobel Prize laureate (d. 2024)
- August 26
  - Saliu Adetunji, Nigerian monarch of Ibadan (d. 2022)
  - Shiva Pasupati, Sri Lankan lawyer and 34th Attorney General (d. 2025)
- August 27
  - Péter Boross, Hungarian politician
  - Mangosuthu Buthelezi, South African leader of the Inkatha Freedom Party (d. 2023)
- August 31
  - James Coburn, American actor (d. 2002)
  - Wojciech Plewiński, Polish photographer
  - Jaime Sin, Filipino Roman Catholic prelate (d. 2005)

=== September ===
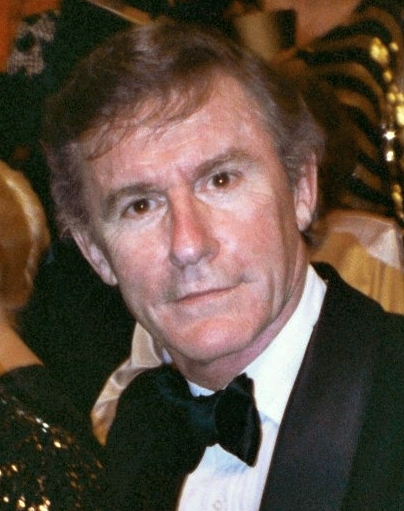
Roddy McDowall

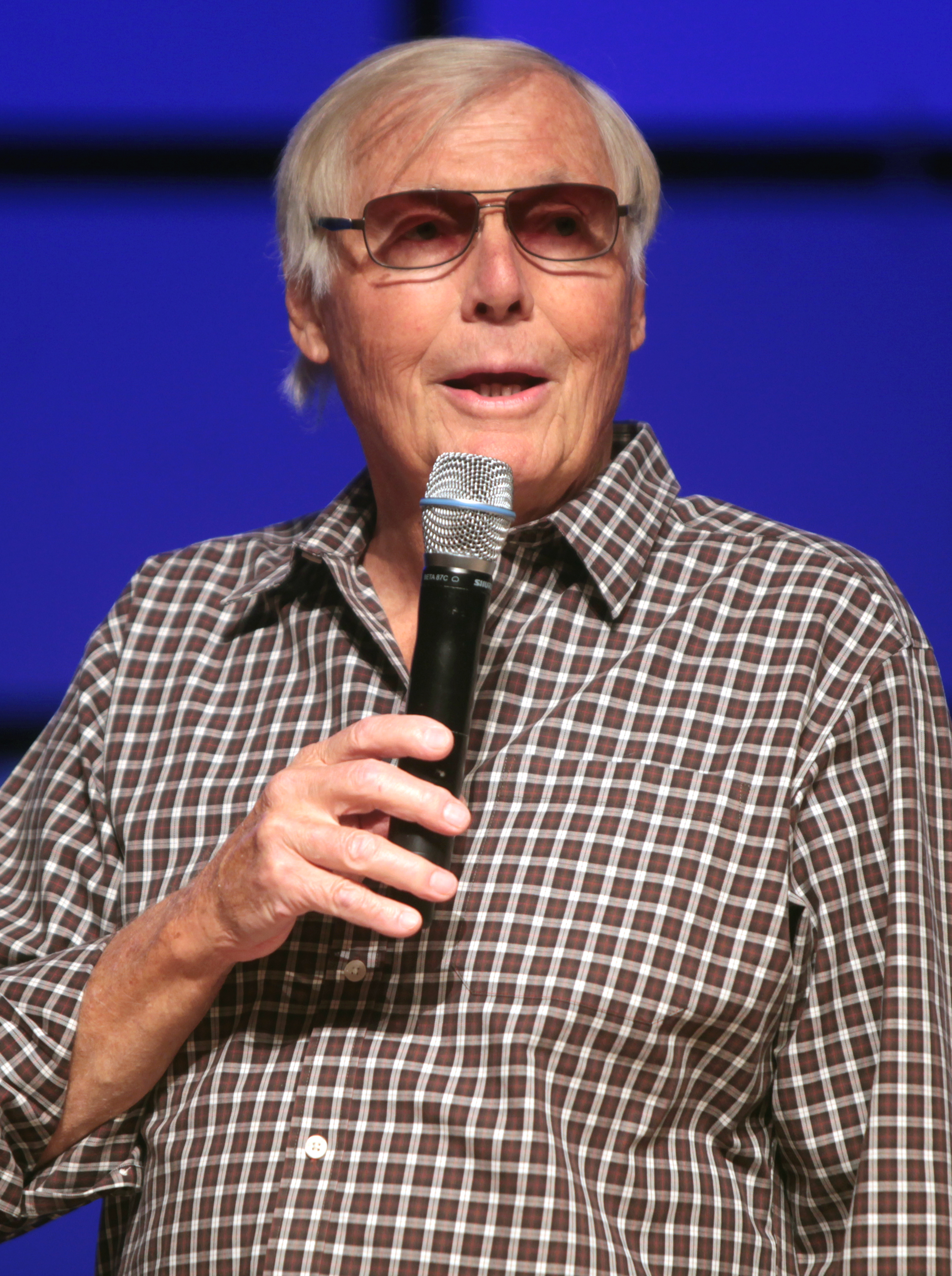
Adam West

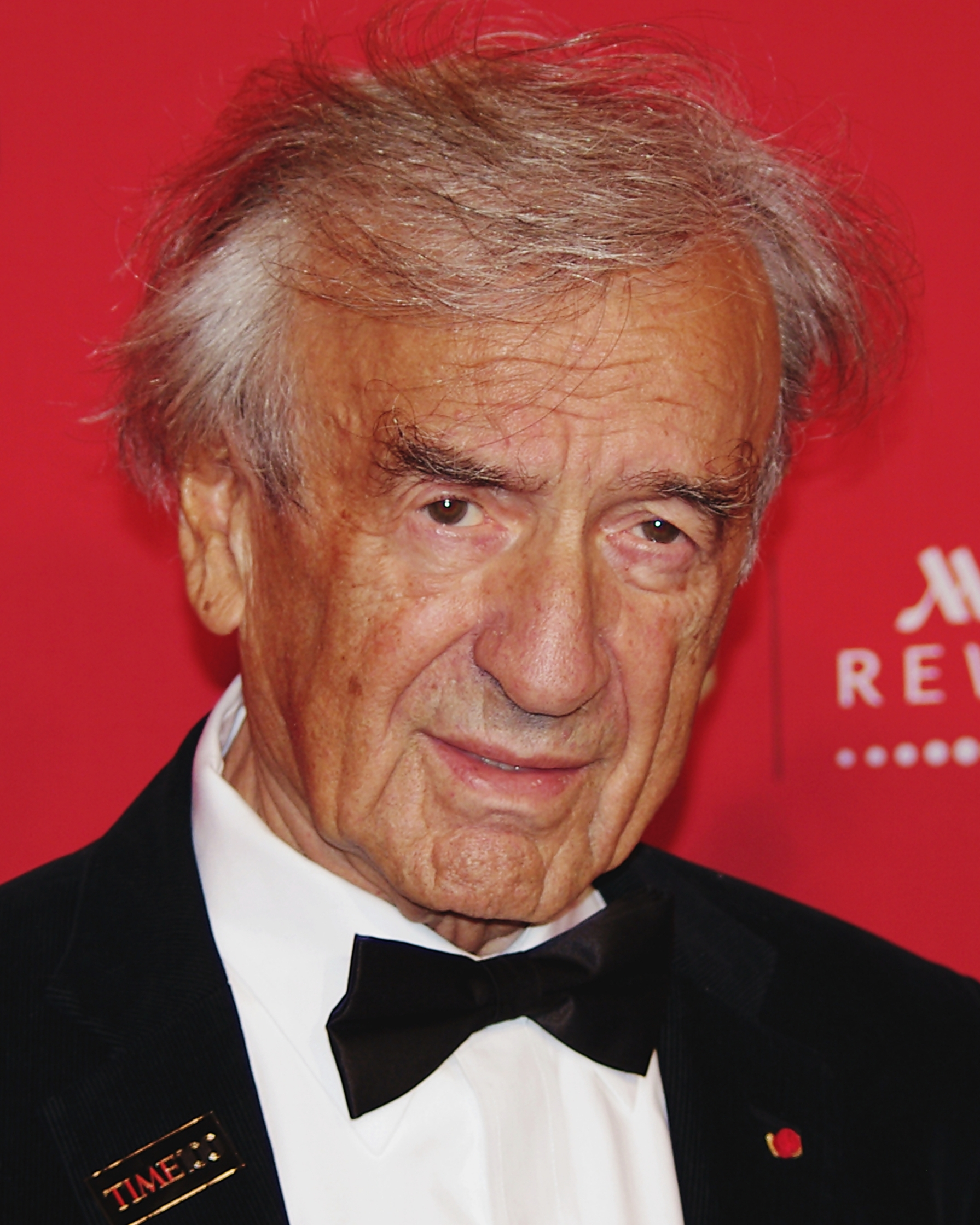
Elie Wiesel

- September 1 – George Maharis, American actor (d. 2023)
- September 3 – Gaston Thorn, Luxembourg Prime Minister (d. 2007)
- September 4 – Dick York, American actor (d. 1992)
- September 6
  - Fumihiko Maki, Japanese architect (d. 2024)
  - Robert M. Pirsig, American philosopher and author (d. 2017)
  - Yevgeny Svetlanov, Russian conductor, composer and pianist (d. 2002)
  - Sid Watkins, English neurosurgeon (d. 2012)
- September 9 – Sol LeWitt, American artist (d. 2007)
- September 10 – Jean Vanier, Swiss-born Canadian Catholic philosopher, theologian and humanitarian (d. 2019)
- September 11 – Earl Holliman, American actor (d. 2024)
- September 13 – Tzannis Tzannetakis, Prime Minister of Greece (d. 2010)
- September 14 – John Geoffrey Jones, British judge (d. 2014)
- September 16 – Hironoshin Furuhashi, Japanese swimmer (d. 2009)
- September 17 – Roddy McDowall, British actor (d. 1998)
- September 19 – Adam West, American actor (Batman) (d. 2017)
- September 20
  - Donald Hall, American poet, United States Poet Laureate (d. 2018)
  - Kirsten Rolffes, Danish actress (d. 2000)
- September 22 – Justin Marie Bomboko, Congolese civil servant (d. 2014)
- September 27 – Edwin Grech, Maltese politician (d. 2023).
- September 28 – Koko Taylor, African-American singer (d. 2009)
- September 29 – Mihály Lantos, Hungarian footballer and manager (d. 1989)
- September 30 – Elie Wiesel, Rumanian-born Holocaust survivor, writer, lecturer, Nobel Peace Prize recipient (d. 2016)

=== October ===
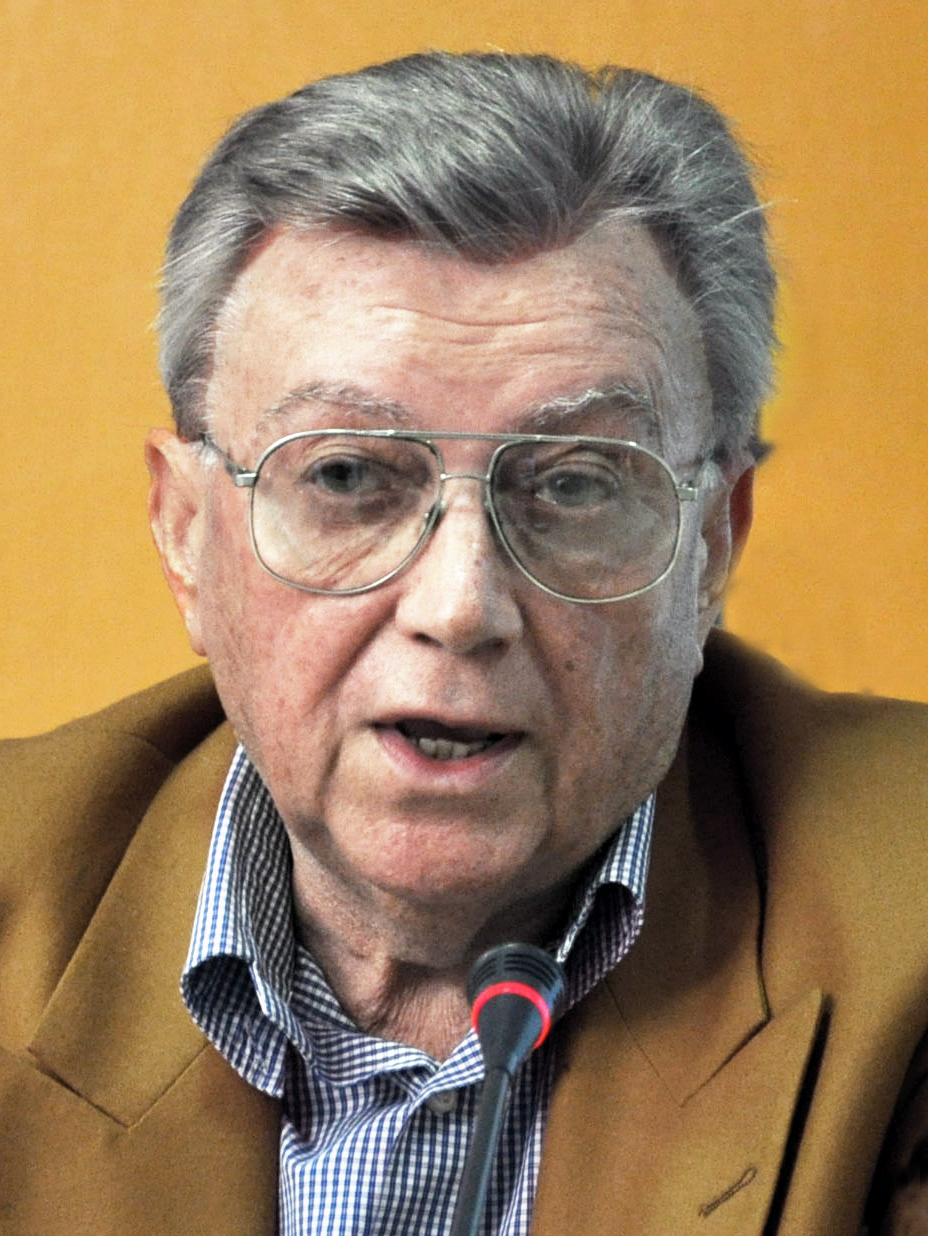
Borisav Jović

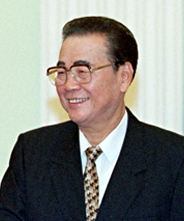
Li Peng

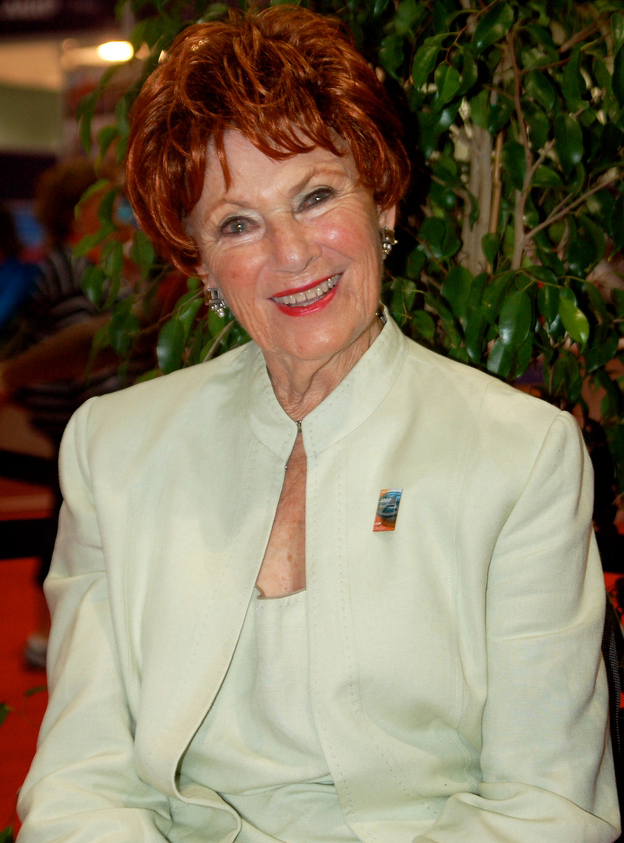
Marion Ross

- October 1
  - Laurence Harvey, Lithuanian-born South African actor (d. 1973)
  - Sivaji Ganesan, Indian stage, film actor (d. 2001)
  - George Peppard, American actor (d. 1994)
- October 2 – Geert Hofstede, Dutch social psychologist (d. 2020)
- October 3
  - Shridath Ramphal, Guyanese academic and politician (d. 2024)
  - Kåre Willoch, Norwegian politician, 23rd Prime Minister of Norway (d. 2021)
  - Erik Bruhn, Danish danseur, choreographer, artistic director, actor, and author (d. 1986)
- October 4 – Torben Ulrich, Danish tennis player (d. 2023)
- October 7
  - Ali Kafi, Algerian politician, acting President 1992–1994 (d. 2013)
  - Sohrab Sepehri, Persian poet and painter (d. 1980)
- October 8 – Neil Harvey, Australian cricketer
- October 9 – Einojuhani Rautavaara, Finnish composer (d. 2016)
- October 14 – Arnfinn Bergmann, Norwegian Olympic ski jumper (d. 2011)
- October 15 – María Cristina Arango Vega, First Lady of Colombia (d. 2017)
- October 18 – Ernest Simoni, Albanian Catholic cardinal
- October 19 – Borisav Jović, 13th President of the Presidency of Yugoslavia (d. 2021)
- October 20 – Li Peng, former Premier of China (d. 2019)
- October 21 – Whitey Ford, American baseball player (d. 2020)
- October 23 – Zhu Rongji, former Premier of China (d. 2026)
- October 24 – Mohammad Beheshti, Chief Justice of Iran (d. 1981)
- October 25
  - Anthony Franciosa, American actor (d. 2006)
  - Paulo Mendes da Rocha, Brazilian architect (d. 2021)
  - Marion Ross, American actress
- October 27 – Gilles Vigneault, Canadian singer and poet
- October 29 – Shulamit Aloni, Israeli politician (d. 2014)
- October 30 – Daniel Nathans, American microbiologist, recipient of the Nobel Prize in Physiology or Medicine (d. 1999)

=== November ===
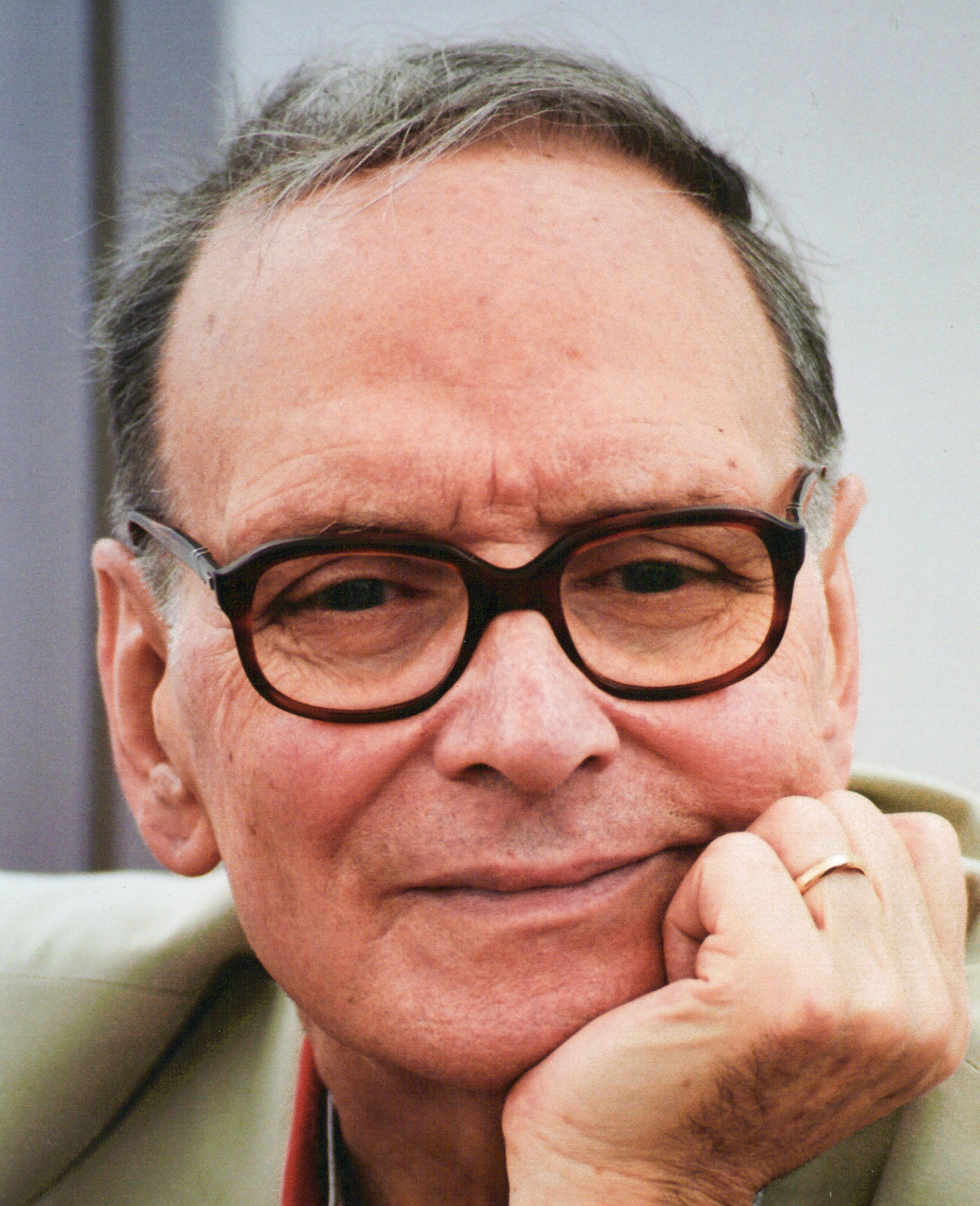
Ennio Morricone

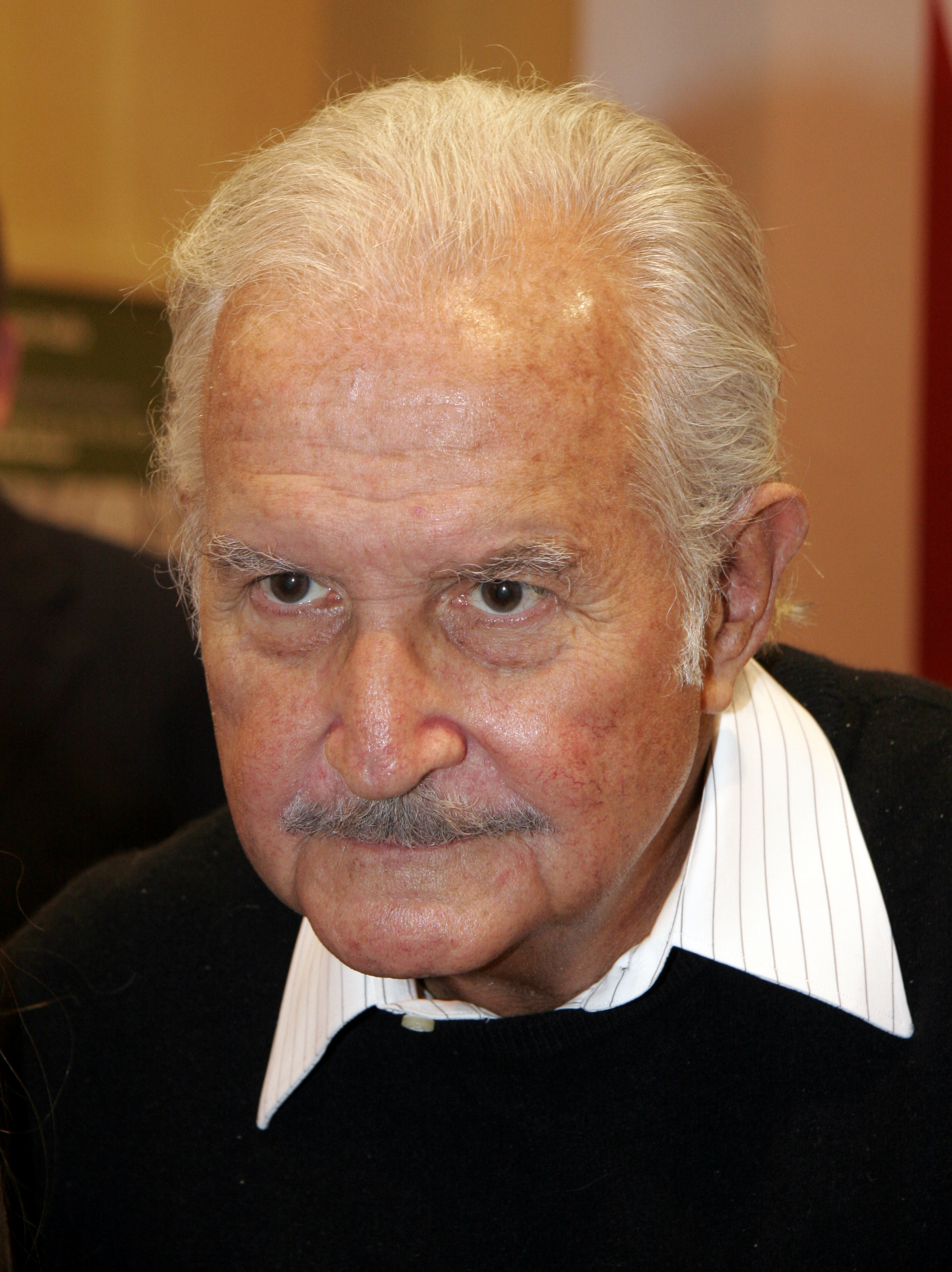
Carlos Fuentes

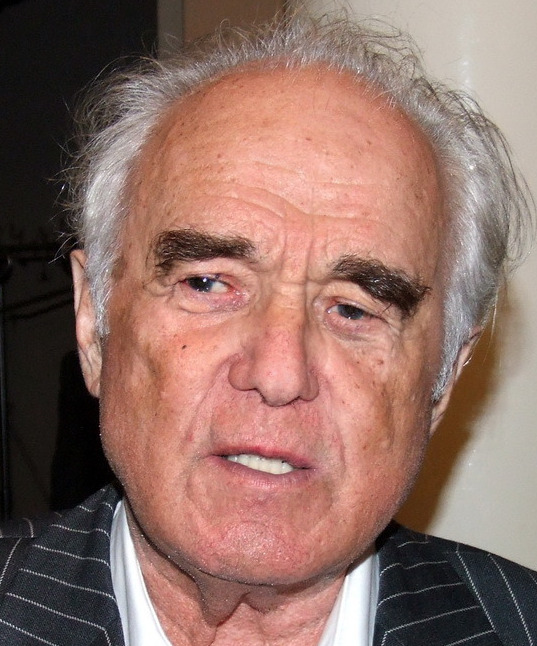
Vitaliy Masol

- November 3
  - Ion Dincă, Romanian communist politician and general (d. 2007)
  - Osamu Tezuka, Japanese manga artist (d. 1989)
  - Nick Holonyak, American electrical engineer and inventor (d. 2022)
- November 8
  - Natalie Zemon Davis, Canadian-born historian (d. 2023)
  - Ursula Haverbeck, German historian (d. 2024)
- November 9 – Anne Sexton, American poet (d. 1974)
- November 10 – Ennio Morricone, Italian composer (d. 2020)
- November 11 – Carlos Fuentes, Mexican writer (d. 2012)
- November 14 – Vitaliy Masol, 3rd Prime Minister of Ukraine (d. 2018)
- November 17
  - Arman, French artist (d. 2005)
  - Rance Howard, American actor (d. 2017)
  - Betty Kaunda, first lady of Zambia (d. 2012)
  - Amata Kabua, 1st president of the Marshall Islands (d. 1996)
- November 18 – Salvador Laurel, Filipino lawyer and politician (d. 2004)
- November 19
  - Ina van Faassen, Dutch actress, comedian (d. 2011)
  - Dara Singh, Indian wrestler, actor and politician (d. 2012)
- November 20
  - Aleksey Batalov, Russian actor (d. 2017)
  - Pete Rademacher, American boxer (d. 2020)
- November 22 – Sandy Keith, American jurist and politician from Minnesota (d. 2020)
- November 28
  - Toaripi Lauti, 1st prime minister of Tuvalu (d. 2014)
  - Arthur Melvin Okun, American economist (d. 1980)
  - Piet Steenbergen, Dutch footballer (d. 2010)
- November 30
  - Takako Doi, Japanese politician (d. 2014)
  - Steele Hall, Australian politician (d. 2024)
  - Peter Hans Kolvenbach, Dutch Superior General of the Society of Jesus (d. 2016)
  - Elmira Nazirova, Azerbaijani composer (d. 2014)
  - Karin Söder, Swedish politician (d. 2015)

=== December ===
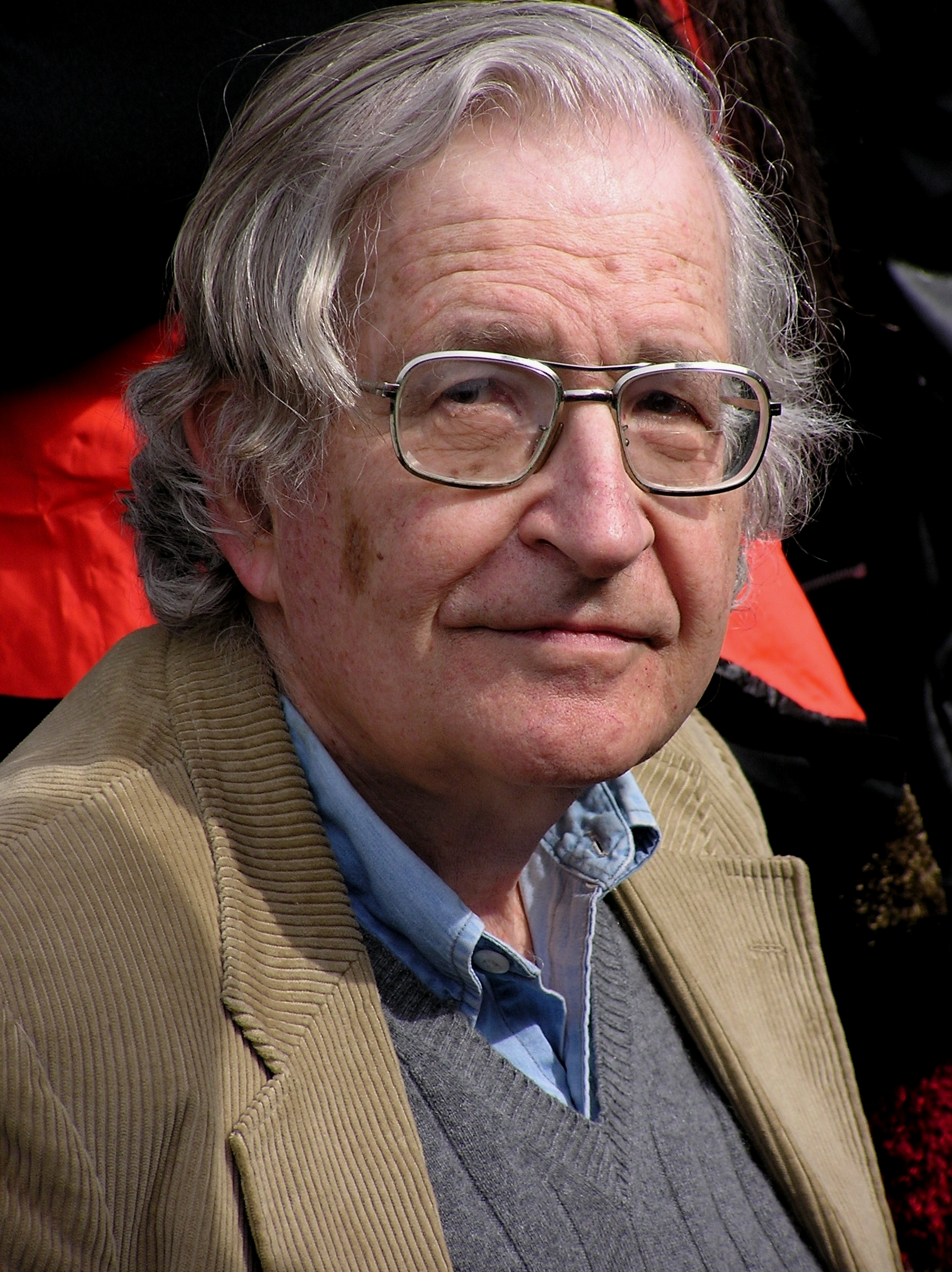
Noam Chomsky

- December 4 – Hebe de Bonafini, Argentine political activist (d. 2022)
- December 7 – Noam Chomsky, American linguist
- December 15
  - Ida Haendel, Polish-British violinist (d. 2020)
  - Friedensreich Hundertwasser, Austrian artist (d. 2000)
- December 16
  - Philip K. Dick, American science fiction author (d. 1982)
  - Friedrich Wilhelm Schnitzler, German landowner, politician (CDU), manager and businessman (d. 2011)
- December 19 – Guy Razanamasy, 2-time prime minister of Madagascar (d. 2011)
- December 22 – Piero Angela, Italian television host, science journalist and writer (d. 2022)
- December 25 – Dick Miller, American actor (d. 2019)
- December 26 – Martin Cooper, American inventor, "Father of the mobile phone"
- December 29 – Bernard Cribbins, English actor, comedian and singer (d. 2022)
- December 30 – Bo Diddley, African-American musician (d. 2008)

== Deaths ==
=== January ===
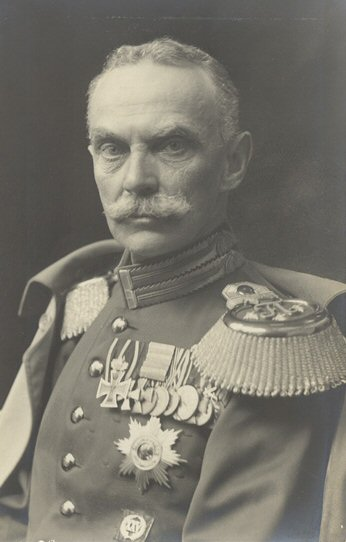
Bernhard III, Duke of Saxe-Meiningen

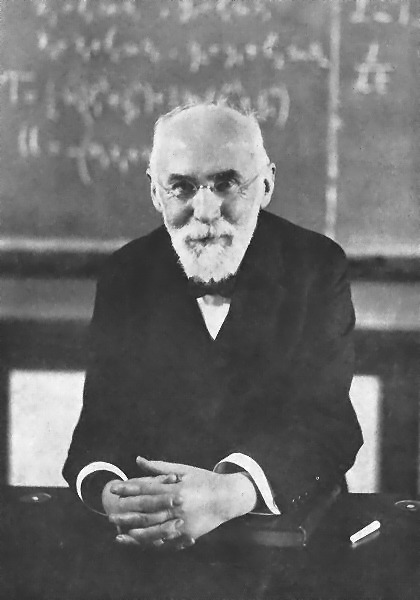
Hendrik Lorentz

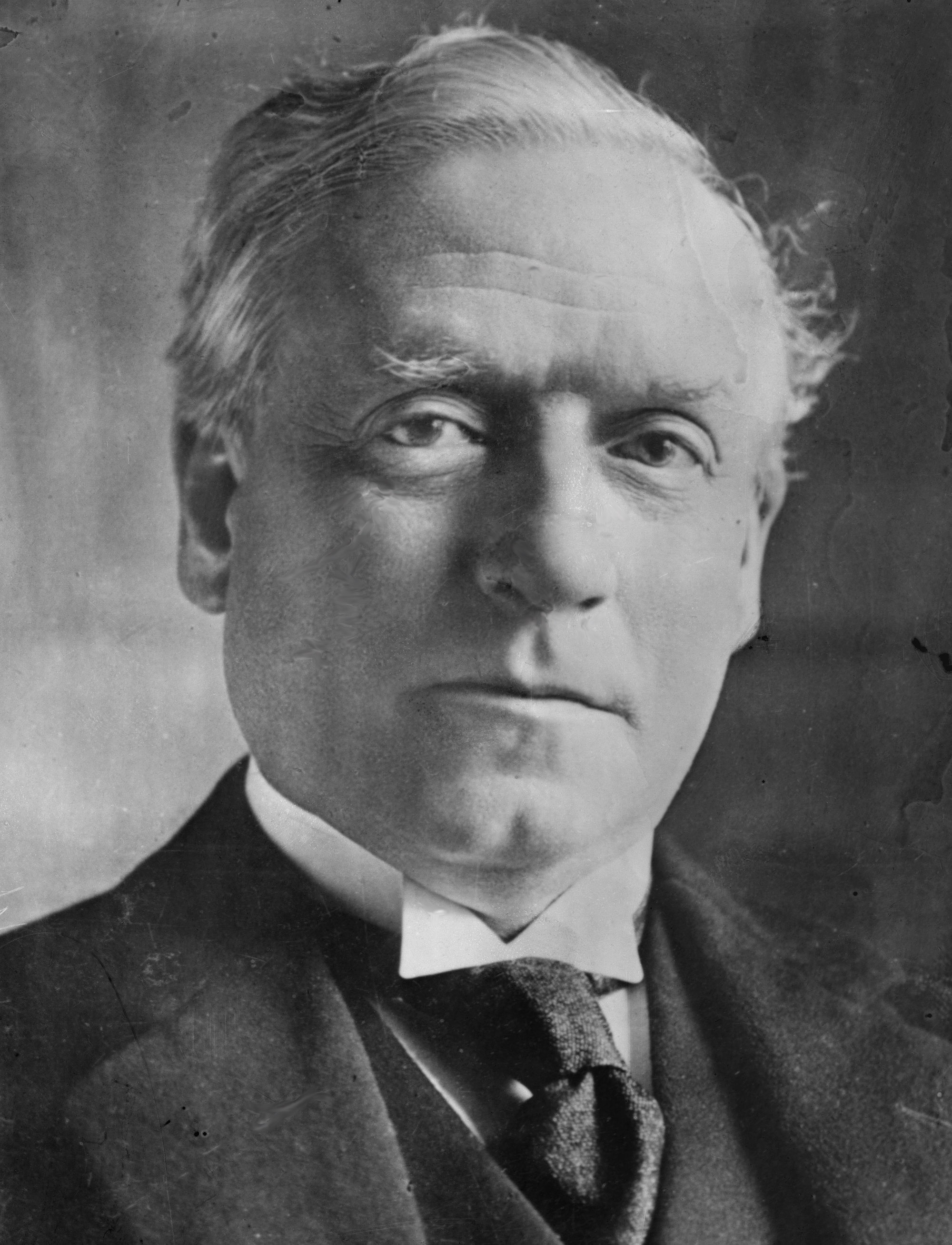
H. H. Asquith

- January 1 – Loie Fuller, American dancer (b. 1862)
- January 3 – Emily Stevens, American actress (b. 1883)
- January 6 – Alvin Kraenzlein, American athlete (b. 1876)
- January 11 – Thomas Hardy, British writer (b. 1840)
- January 12 – Ruth Snyder, American murderer (executed) (b. 1895)
- January 13 – Earle Nelson, American serial killer and rapist (executed) (b. 1897)
- January 16 – Bernhard III, Duke of Saxe-Meiningen (b. 1851)
- January 21
  - Nikolai Astrup, Norwegian painter (b. 1880)
  - Sir John de Robeck, British admiral (b. 1862)
- January 28 – Vicente Blasco Ibáñez, Spanish novelist and screenwriter (b. 1867)
- January 29 – Douglas Haig, 1st Earl Haig, British field marshal (b. 1861)
- January 30 – Johannes Fibiger, Danish scientist, recipient of the Nobel Prize in Physiology or Medicine (b. 1867)

=== February ===
- February 1 – Hughie Jennings, American baseball player, MLB Hall of Famer (b. 1869)
- February 4 – Hendrik Lorentz, Dutch physicist, Nobel Prize laureate (b. 1853)
- February 8 – Theodor Curtius, German chemist (b. 1857)
- February 12 – Manfred von Clary-Aldringen, Austro-Hungarian nobleman, statesman and former prime minister of Austria (b. 1852)
- February 15 – H. H. Asquith, Prime Minister of the United Kingdom (b. 1852)
- February 16 – Eddie Foy Sr., American vaudevillian (b. 1856)
- February 21 – Hans von Koester, German admiral (b. 1844)
- February 25 – Toribio Romo González, Mexican Roman Catholic priest, martyr and saint (b. 1900)
- February 26 – Juan Vázquez de Mella, Spanish scholar, politician (b. 1861)
- February 27 – Karl Max, Prince Lichnowsky, German diplomat, noble (b. 1860)
- February 28 – Armando Diaz, Italian general, Marshal of Italy (b. 1861)

=== March ===
- March 7 – Robert Abbe, American surgeon (b. 1851)
- March 10 – Mateo Elías Nieves Castillo, Mexican Roman Catholic priest and blessed (b. 1882)
- March 19
  - Nora Bayes, American singer, actress (b. 1880)
  - Emil Wiechert, German physicist and geophysicist (b. 1861)
- March 21 – Edward Walter Maunder, British astronomer (b. 1851)
- March 25 – Nina Bang, Danish politician (b. 1866)

=== April ===
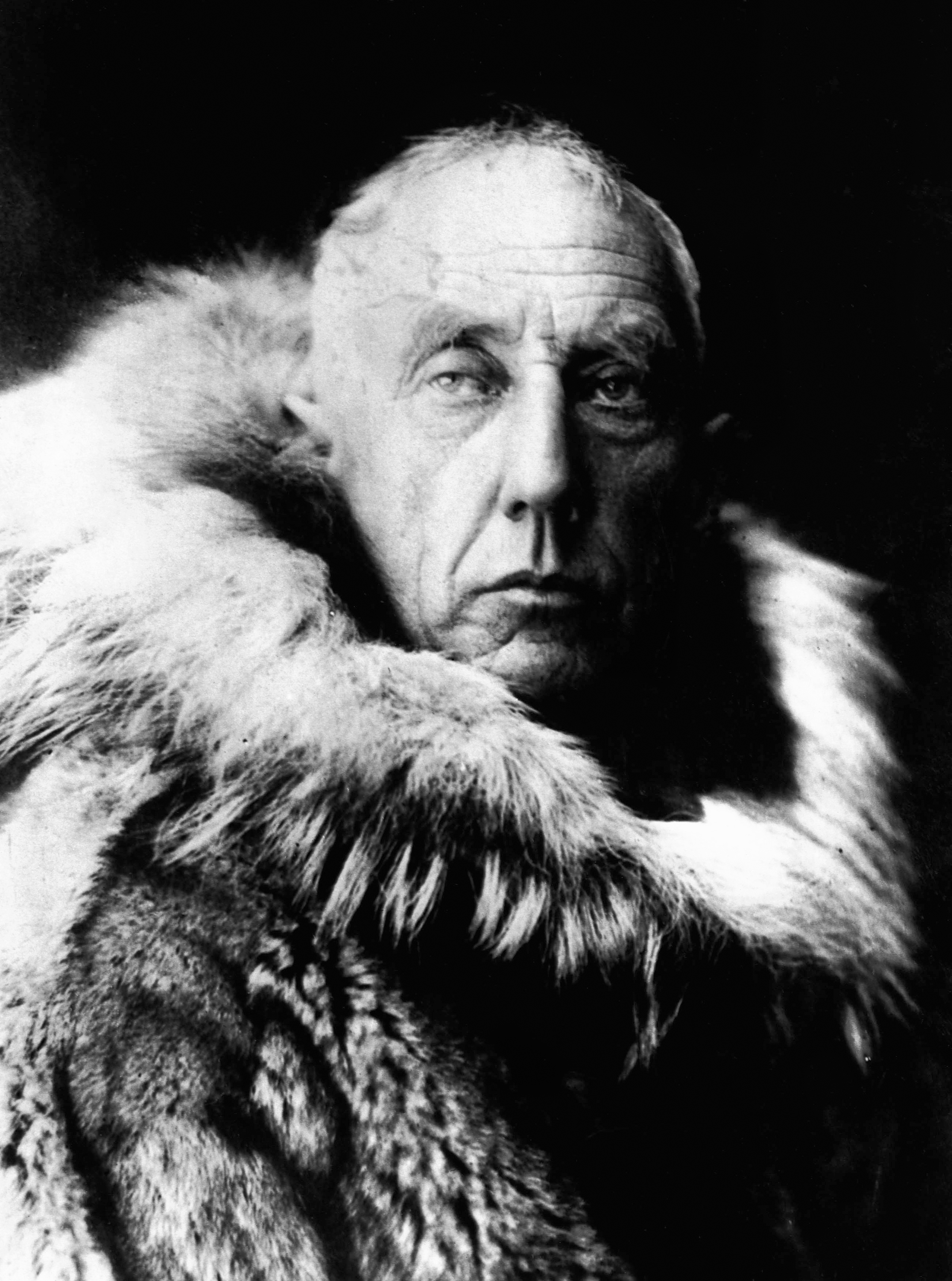
Roald Amundsen

- April 2 – Theodore William Richards, American chemist, Nobel Prize laureate (b. 1868)
- April 5 – Roy Kilner, English cricketer (b. 1890)
- April 13 – Gonzalo Córdova, 21st president of Ecuador (b. 1863)
- April 16 – Pavel Axelrod, Russian Menshevik (b. 1850)
- April 19 – Dorus Rijkers, Dutch sailor, savior of over 500 men, women and children (b. 1847)
- April 25
  - Floyd Bennett, American aviator (b. 1890)
  - Pyotr Wrangel, Russian general, anti-Bolshevik leader (b. 1878)
- April 27 – Alessandro Guidoni, Italian air force general (b. 1880)

=== May ===
- May 1 – Sir Ebenezer Howard, British urban planner (b. 1850)
- May 8 – Clara Williams, American actress (b. 1888)
- May 10 – Ivan Merz, Yugoslav Roman Catholic blessed (b. 1896)
- May 18
  - Moritz von Auffenberg, Austro-Hungarian general and politician (b. 1852)
  - Bill Haywood, American labor leader (b. 1869)
- May 19 – Max Scheler, German philosopher (b. 1874)
- May 21 – Hideyo Noguchi, Japanese bacteriologist (b. 1876)

=== June ===
- June 2 – Otto Nordenskjöld, Finnish and Swedish geologist, geographer and polar explorer (road traffic accident) (b. 1869)
- June 3
  - Alexander Hamilton, American priest and blessed (b. 1847)
  - Li Yuanhong, Fourth President of the Republic of China (b. 1864)
- June 4 – Zhang Zuolin, Chinese warlord (assassinated) (b. 1875)
- June 5 – Sir Liege Hulett, South African politician, sugar magnate (b. 1838)
- June 12 – Salvador Díaz Mirón, Mexican poet (b. 1853)
- June 13 – Charles Wynn-Carington, 1st Marquess of Lincolnshire, British politician and colonial governor (b. 1843)
- June 14 – Emmeline Pankhurst, British women's suffrage campaigner (b. 1858)
- June 17 – Euphemia Wilson Pitblado, American activist, social reformer and writer (b. 1849)
- June 18 – Roald Amundsen, Norwegian polar explorer (aviation accident) (b. 1872)
- June 22
  - A. B. Frost, American illustrator (b. 1851)
  - George Siegmann, American silent film actor (pernicious anemia) (b. 1882)
- June 28 – Leo Ditrichstein, Austrian-born actor, playwright (b. 1865)

=== July ===
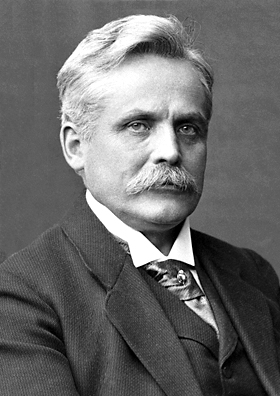
Wilhelm Wien

- July 1
  - Avery Hopwood, American playwright (b. 1882)
  - Frankie Yale, American gangster (b. 1893)
- July 12 – Emilio Carranza, Mexican aviator (b. 1905; plane crash)
- July 17
  - Álvaro Obregón, Mexican military officer, 39th President of Mexico (assassinated) (b. 1880)
  - Giovanni Giolitti, Italian politician, 13th Prime Minister of Italy (b. 1842)
- July 21
  - Mihail Savov, Bulgarian general (b. 1857)
  - Dame Ellen Terry, British actress (b. 1847)
- July 30 – John Christopher Cutler, 2nd Governor of Utah (suicide) (b. 1846)

=== August ===
- August 8
  - Frederick II, Grand Duke of Baden (b. 1857)
  - Stjepan Radić, Croatian politician (assassinated) (b. 1871)
- August 12 – Leoš Janáček, Czech composer (b. 1854)
- August 16 – Carlo Del Prete, Italian aviator (b. 1897)
- August 19
  - Richard Haldane, 1st Viscount Haldane, British politician, lawyer (b. 1856)
  - Stephanos Skouloudis, 34th prime minister of Greece (b. 1838)
- August 25 – Alfred Meyer-Waldeck, German admiral (b. 1864)
- August 27 – Émile Fayolle, French general (b. 1852)
- August 30
  - Sir Hugh Evan-Thomas, British admiral (b. 1862)
  - Wilhelm Wien, German physicist, Nobel Prize laureate (b. 1864)

=== September ===
- September 13 – Italo Svevo, Italian writer, businessman (b. 1861)
- September (unknown date) – Ioan Culcer, Romanian general and politician (b. 1853)

=== October ===
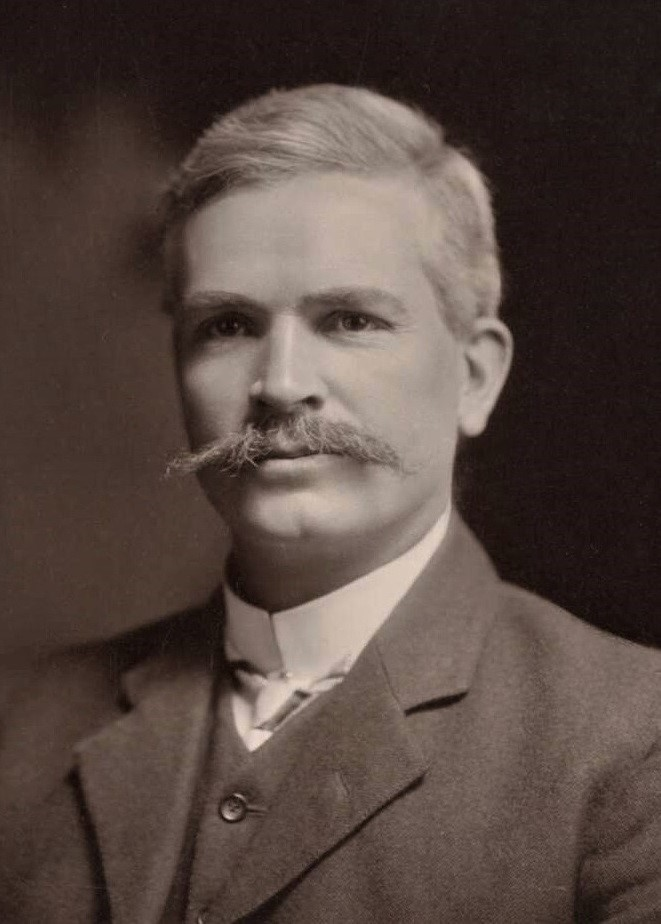
Andrew Fisher

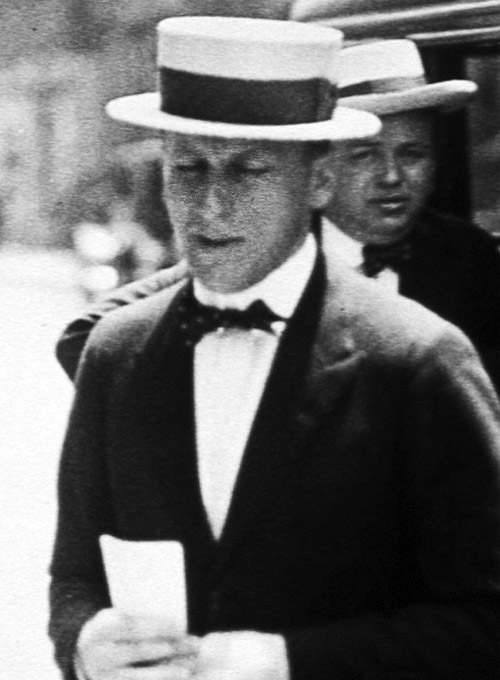
Arnold Rothstein

Heinrich XXVII, Prince Reuss Younger Line

- October 1 – Cecilia Eusepi, Italian religious leader and blessed (b. 1910)
- October 8 – Larry Semon, American film actor (b. 1889)
- October 13 – Dagmar of Denmark, later Maria Fyodorovna, wife of Tsar Alexander III and Empress Consort of Russia (b. 1847)
- October 22 – Andrew Fisher, 5th Prime Minister of Australia (b. 1862)
- October 30 – Robert Lansing, U.S. Secretary of State (b. 1864)

=== November ===
- November 6 – Arnold Rothstein, Jewish-American businessman, gangster (b. 1882)
- November 10 – Alexander Trepov, former prime minister of the Russian Empire (b. 1862)
- November 13
  - Enrico Cecchetti, Italian ballet dancer (b. 1850)
  - Oskar Victorovich Stark, Russian admiral, explorer (b. 1846)
- November 17 – Lala Lajpat Rai (The Lion of Punjab), Indian independence movement leader (b. 1865)
- November 18 – Mauritz Stiller, Finnish screenwriter, director (b. 1883)
- November 21 – Heinrich XXVII, Prince Reuss Younger Line, German prince (b. 1858)
- November 24 – Alphonse Jacques de Dixmude, Belgian general (b. 1858)
- November 26 – Reinhard Scheer, German admiral (b. 1863)
- November 27 – Frank Hedges Butler, British wine merchant, founding member of the Aero Club of Great Britain (b. 1855)

=== December ===
- December 1
  - Arthur Gore, British tennis player (b. 1868)
  - José Eustasio Rivera, Colombian writer (b. 1888)
- December 2 – Hallam Tennyson, 2nd Baron Tennyson, 2nd Governor-General of Australia (b. 1852)
- December 4 – Delina Filkins, American supercentenarian, and the oldest verified person in history at the time of her death (b. 1815)
- December 10 – Charles Rennie Mackintosh, British architect (b. 1868)
- December 11 – Lewis Howard Latimer, American inventor (b. 1848)
- December 12 – Patriarch Gregory IV of Antioch (b. 1859)
- December 14
  - Theodore Roberts, American actor (b. 1861)
  - Pierre Ruffey, French general (b. 1851)
- December 16 – Elinor Wylie, American poet and novelist (b. 1885)
- December 17 – Eglantyne Jebb, British human rights activist, co-founder of Save the Children (b. 1876)
- December 19 – Italo Svevo, Italian writer (b. 1861)
- December 21
  - Luigi Cadorna, Italian general (b. 1850)
  - Elizabeth Carter Bogardus, Hawaiian Kingdom community leader (b. 1895)
- December 25 – Fred Thomson, American actor (b. 1890)

== Nobel Prizes ==

- Physics – Owen Willans Richardson
- Chemistry – Adolf Otto Reinhold Windaus
- Physiology or Medicine – Charles Jules Henri Nicolle
- Literature – Sigrid Undset
- Peace – not awarded
