= Television systems before 1940 =

TV introduction by decade 1930-39 1940-49 1950-59 1960-69 1970-79 1980-89 1990-99 2000-- No broadcasts No data

A number of experimental and broadcast pre World War II television systems were tested. The first ones were mechanical based (mechanical television) and of very low resolution, sometimes with no sound. Later TV systems were electronic (electronic television).

For a list of mechanical system tests and development, see mechanical television. For a station list see Prewar television stations

== France ==
- France 1930 (mechanical): 30 lines, 12.5 frame/s
- France 1932 (mechanical): 60 lines, 12.5 frame/s, 3:7 vertical aspect ratio, vertical scanning ~35×60 pixels per frame, sound, live images
- France 1935-1936 (electronic): 180 lines
- France 1937-1939 (electronic): 455 lines, developed by Rene Barthelemy
- France 1943-1956 (electronic): 441 lines

== Germany ==
- Doberitz 1932 (mechanical): 48 lines, 25 frame/s, 4:3 horizontal aspect ratio, ~64×48 pixels per frame, sound, talking movies
- Berlin R.P.Z. 1932 (mechanical): 60 lines, 25 frame/s, 4:3 horizontal aspect ratio, ~83×60 pixels per frame, test movies and live images
- Germany 1932: 90 lines
- Germany 1935: 180 lines
- Germany 1936: 375 lines
- Germany 1937: 441 lines, 25 frame/s, line frequency 11,025 Hz. Vision 46.0 MHz Sound 43.2 MHz.
- Germany 1940: 1,000 lines signal projection, no glass screen but projection screen (successful experiments in Reichspost laboratories, but no mass production, note that in Germany public telegraphy, telephone, and radio services were subject to the Reichspostministerium since the early 20th century, and TV was regarded a postal issue as well until the 1980s)

== Netherlands ==
- Netherlands 1930s: 441 lines, 25 frame/s, line frequency 11,025 Hz
- Late 1940s: 567 lines

== Poland ==
- Warsaw 1937 (mechanical): 120 lines, test movies and live images from a studio
- Electronic TV (343 lines) was under development and was publicly demonstrated during the Radio Exhibition in Warsaw in August 1939, regular operations planned to start at the beginning of 1940, work stopped because of the outbreak of World War II.

== Switzerland ==
- Switzerland 1932 (mechanical): 30 lines, 16.6 frame/s, 4:3 horizontal aspect ratio, ~40×30 pixels per frame, test movies and live images

== Italy ==
During the 1930s there were also experimental transmissions from the Vatican - but further details are unknown. Later Arturo Castellani emerges as the main figure being early regular broadcasts.

- Italy 1932 (mechanical): 60 lines, 20 frame/s, 4:3 horizontal aspect ratio, ~45x60 pixels per frame, test movies and live images
- Italy 1937 (electronic): 375 lines, 25 frame/s, 4:3 horizontal aspect ratio, daily from Rome, between 6pm and 9.30pm on 6.9 meters with a power of 2 kW
- Italy 1939 (electronic): 441 lines, 25 frame/s, 4:3 horizontal aspect ratio, regular service from Rome and Milan. 2 kW transmission power on VHF 45 MHz

== UK ==
=== Mechanical ===
- England 1926 (Baird mechanical): 30 lines, 5 frame/s, black-and-white experimental transmissions
- England 1928 (Baird mechanical): 30 lines, 5 frame/s, first experimental colour TV transmissions
- London 1929 (Baird mechanical): 30 lines, 12.5 frame/s, 3:7 vertical aspect ratio, vertical scanning, ~70×30 pixels per frame, sound (silent until 1930), live TV from studio, used experimentally from September 1929 to September 1935
- England 1936 (Baird): 240 lines, 25 frame/s, line frequency 6000 Hz, used from November 1936 to February 1937

=== Electronic ===
- UK (1936, EMI): 405 lines / 50 Hz. Used by the BBC Alexandra Palace television station initially from November 1936 to 1939 and then 1946 to 1985 (interruption due to Second World War).
  - The EMI 405 lines system was the first to have an ITU System Letter Designation, and is known as System A. As the EMI system predates PAL, there is no PAL designator in the ITU television system table.

== USSR ==
- 1932 (mechanical): 30 lines, 12.5 frame/s, 4:3 horizontal aspect ratio, ~40x30 pixels per frame, test movies and live images
- Leningrad (St. Petersburg), 1935 (electronic): 180 lines, 25 frame/s with progressive scanning
- Leningrad (St. Petersburg), 1937 (electronic): 240 lines, 25 frame/s with progressive scanning
- Moscow, 1938 (electronic): 343 lines, 25 frame/s, 4:3 horizontal aspect ratio (RCA provided broadcast equipment and documentation for TV sets)

== USA ==
- USA 1933: 240 lines
- USA 1936: 343 lines; limited public demonstrations in New York City (RCA) and Philadelphia (Philco). Field tests in Los Angeles used various line systems, but adopted RCA's 441 lines system by 1938.
- USA 1938-9: First TV receivers sold on a very limited basis, mostly in New York. Manufacturers included RCA, General Electric, DuMont, and Andrea.
- USA 1937-1941: 441 lines @ 30 fps (RCA) and 605 lines (Proposed by Philco).
- USA 1941-1945: 375 lines @ 60 fps field sequential color, tested by CBS in New York.

== See also ==
- Timeline of the BBC
- History of television
- Timeline of the introduction of television in countries
- Timeline of the introduction of colour television in countries
- Geographical usage of television
- Oldest radio station
- Prewar television stations
- List of experimental television stations
- Narrow-bandwidth television
- Oldest television station
- Early television stations

=== Individual television stations ===
- WRGB
- WNBC-TV
- WCBS-TV
- KCBS-TV
- BBC/BBC Television
- Fernsehsender Paul Nipkow

=== Broadcast television systems ===
- 405-line television system
- 576-lines
- 625-lines
- 819-line television system
- NTSC
- PAL
- SECAM

=== Related topics in television systems ===
- Mechanical television
- 180-line television system
- 375-line television system
- 441-line television system
- Narrow-bandwidth television
- Display resolution
