= KC2XAK =

World's first UHF television station

Translator of WNBT, New York, New York
- Bridgeport, Connecticut; United States
- Channels: Analog: 24 (UHF)

Programming
- Affiliations: NBC

Ownership
- Owner: National Broadcasting Company

History
- First air date: December 29, 1949
- Last air date: August 23, 1952 (2 years, 238 days)

Technical information
- ERP: 10 kW
- HAAT: 450 ft (137 m)
- Transmitter coordinates: 41.1934302°N 73.1548329°W

KC2XAK was the world's first UHF television station, which went on the air on December 29, 1949. It was a broadcast translator of New York City's WNBT (today's WNBC), and broadcast on 529–535 MHz in Bridgeport, Connecticut. The location was chosen on February 8, 1949 and was justified for its population of over 200,000; there was also no locally-originating television service at the time, meaning that the city was caught between relays of the VHF stations from New York and New Haven's WNHC.

The station's launch was code-named "Operation Bridgeport", as a test by RCA and NBC, to determine if the UHF spectrum was feasible to use for communications and broadcasting as part of a nationwide television station plan. It was operational during a several-year freeze on new television stations by the FCC which lasted from October 1948 to April 1952.

The station used a 1 kW transmitter with a 20-dB gain antenna on a 210-foot (64 m) tower elevated 450 feet (140 m) above average terrain at the top of Success Hill. This resulted in an effective radiated power of 10 kW. This relayed the signal from WNBT atop the Empire State Building.

Operation Bridgeport was a success in the sense that it demonstrated the viability of UHF broadcasting, and UHF became a major part of the FCC's plan for new television licensing in the early 1950s. KC2XAK was shut down by RCA and NBC on August 23, 1952, a few months after the 1948 freeze on new television licenses was lifted. KC2XAK thus was not only the first UHF television station operational in the United States, but the only one for several years.

Once KC2XAK's transmitter was shut down, Empire Coil purchased it, and the transmitter and support equipment were dismantled in Bridgeport under supervision of RCA. Dismantling began on August 25 and was shipped via truck and fast freight train to Portland, Oregon. The transmitter was re-assembled as a 250-foot (76 m) tower on Council Crest, more than 1,000 feet (300 m) above Portland on September 9, 1952. Thus, KC2XAK's transmitter was re-used for Portland's KPTV, which became the first commercial full-power UHF television station in the country. KPTV would utilize the transmitter for five years on channel 27, before merging with another broadcaster on VHF channel 12 in 1957, where it has broadcast since (though the station is scheduled to return its physical transmission to UHF some time in 2022).

Bridgeport is now covered over-the-air by WNBC and the other New York City broadcast stations.

== See also ==
- Early television stations
- History of television
- List of experimental television stations
- Narrow-bandwidth television
- Oldest television station
- Television systems before 1940
