= Prewar television stations =

List of pre-World War 2 television stations

This is a list of pre-World War II television stations of the 1920s and 1930s. Most of these experimental stations were located in Europe (notably in the United Kingdom, France, Germany, Italy, Poland, the Netherlands, and Russia), Australia, Canada, and the United States. Some present-day broadcasters trace their origins to these early stations.

All television licenses in the United States were officially "experimental" before July 1941, as the NTSC television standard had yet to be developed. Some American television broadcasters continued operating under experimental licenses as late as 1947, although by then they were using the same technical standards as their commercial brethren.

== List ==
- Present North American broadcast television starts at 54 MHz (VHF)
- Present day UK TV broadcasts begin at 470 MHz (UHF)

Television stations
Call sign (original)	Call sign (current)	Frequency*	Channel (current)	Location (city)	On air	Owner (original)	Original broadcast system	Current broadcast system
Baird Television Development Company Ltd via BBC transmitter 2LO		361 meters 831 kHz		London, England, United Kingdom	1926–1935	British Broadcasting Company	Mechanical television 30 lines 25 frame/s	
W2XB (also branded as WGY-TV from its sister radio station)	WRGB	2.15 MHz	6	Schenectady New York, United States	May 10, 1928 – present	General Electric Co.	Mechanical television 24 (later 48) lines/21 frame/s	NTSC-M from 1942–2009; now ATSC digital.
W1XAY (also branded as WLEX from its sister radio station)		3.5 MHz		Lexington, Massachusetts, United States	June 14, 1928– March 1930	The Boston Post	Mechanical television 48 lines/18 frame/s	
W3XK		1.605 MHz & 6.42 MHz, later 2.00–2.10 MHz		Wheaton; Washington, D.C., United States	July 2, 1928– 1932	Charles Jenkins Laboratories	Mechanical television 48 lines	
W2XAL (also branded as WRNY from its sister radio station)				New York City, New York, United States	August 13, 1928– 1929	Experimenter Publishing Curtiss Aeroplane and Motor Company	Mechanical television 48 lines	
W1WX (later became W1XAV)		2.12 MHz		Boston, Massachusetts, United States	Spring 1929–1931	Shortwave and Television Laboratory	Mechanical television 48 & 60 lines/15 frame/s	
W2XBS	WNBC	2.75–2.85 MHz	Formerly Channel 1; moved to VHF Channel 4 from 1946–2009 (remains PSIP virtual channel); allocated to digital channel 28 from 1999–2018; moved to channel share with WNJU on channel 36 from 2018–present	New York City, New York, United States	1929–1932, 1936–present	National Broadcasting Company	Mechanical television 60 lines/20 frame/s	1941–2009, NTSC-M; now ATSC digital
3UZ. Experiments carried out on the radio station after it had officially closed down for the night.		930 kHz		Melbourne, Victoria, Australia	1929	Oliver John Nilsen	Mechanical television	
3DB. Experiments carried out on the radio station after it had officially closed down for the night.		1180 kHz		Melbourne, Victoria, Australia	1929	The Herald and Weekly Times	Mechanical television	
W9XAP	WNBQ-TV (1948–1964) now WMAQ-TV		VHF Channel 5	Chicago, Illinois, United States	August 27, 1930– August 1933. 1948-present.	National Broadcasting Company	Mechanical television	1948–2009 NTSC-M; now ATSC digital
VE9EC			41 MHz	Montreal, Quebec, Canada	1931–1935	La Presse and CKAC radio	Mechanical television 60–150 lines	
W6XAO	KCBS-TV		Formerly on Channel 1, now VHF Channel 2	Los Angeles, California, United States	June 1931– 1933, 1937–1948 as experimental Don Lee station; May 6, 1948– present	Don Lee	Mechanical television, film only, 80 lines/20 frame/s	1948–2009, NTSC-M; now ATSC digital
Amateur radio station 4CM		136 metres		Brisbane, Queensland, Australia	1934	Dr Val McDowall	Early experiments with electronic television	
W6XYZ	KTLA		Formerly on Channel 4, now VHF Channel 5	Los Angeles, California, United States	June 1942– 1946 experimental, Jan. 22, 1947– present	Paramount		1947–2009, NTSC-M, now ATSC digital
W2XAB	WCBS-TV	2.1–2.2 MHz	Now VHF Channel 2	New York City, New York, United States	July 31, 1931– February 1933, 1939–present	Columbia Broadcasting System	Mechanical television 60 lines/20 frame/s	1941–2009, NTSC-M, now ATSC digital
W2XWV	WNYW		Channel 4 (1938–1944), Channel 5 (1944 – present)	New York City, New York, United States	1938– present	Allen B. DuMont	Unknown	1944–2009 NTSC-M, now ATSC digital
W3XE	WPTZ (now KYW-TV)	–	VHF Channel 3	Philadelphia, Pennsylvania, United States	1932–present	Philco Corporation	Mechanical television	1941–2009, NTSC-M, now ATSC digital
W9XBK	WBKB (now WBBM-TV)		Formerly on Channel 4, then on VHF Channel 2, Now on VHF Channel 12	Chicago, Illinois, United States	1940–present	Balaban & Katz		1944–2009, NTSC-M, now ATSC digital
W9XZV	Later KS2XBS (Phonevision experimental on Channel 2)		VHF Channel 1	Chicago, Illinois, United States	1939–1953			
2LO (BBC Television Service)	BBC One	361 meters 831 kHz	UHF (Channels 21–68, throughout UK)	London, England, United Kingdom	August 22, 1932– September 11, 1935	British Broadcasting Corporation	Mechanical television 30 lines/12.5 frame/s	Now DVB
BBC Television Service (Alexandra Palace)	BBC One	45 MHz	UHF (Channels 21–68, throughout UK and on Astra 2D satellite)	London, England, United Kingdom	November 1936– September 3, 1939, June 7, 1946 – present	British Broadcasting Corporation	Mechanical television 240 lines (Baird system) and electronic television 405 line (Marconi-EMI system)/25 frame/s	Now DVB
EIAR – Stazione sperimentale radiovisione di Monte Mario	RAI – Radiotelevisione Italiana	40.54 MHz (audio), 44.12 MHz (video)	VHF (channel 9) and UHF (channels 25, 26, 30 and 40)	Rome, Italy	July 22, 1939– May 10, 1940		Electronic television 441 lines / 21 to 42 frame/s.	Now DVB
EIAR – Stazione sperimentale radiovisione Torre Littoria (now Torre Branca)		40.50 MHz (audio), 44.00 MHz (video)		Milan, Italy	April 12–28, 1940		Electronic television 441 lines / 21 to 42 frame/s.	
Radiovision PTT (1935) later Paris Television (1943) then RTF (1946) (Eiffel Tower)	TF1	37 MHz (180 & 455 lines) later 42–46 MHz (441 lines)	UHF Channels 21–69 (System L + DVB throughout France and FTA on AB3 satellite)	Paris, France	November 1935 – 1937 (60 lines, then 180 lines) later 1938–1939 (455 lines) then 1943–1956 (441 lines)	Ministry of Information	Mechanical television 60 then 180 line later electronic television 455 then 441 line/25 frame/s	Now DVB
Fernsehsender Paul Nipkow				Berlin; Potsdam, Germany	1935–1944 (tests started in 1929)	Deutscher Fernseh-Rundfunk	Electronic television 180 lines/25 frame/s/50 fields/sec (started broadcasting in 441 lines in mid-1937)	
Moscow test broadcasting station МТЦ (from Shukhov tower)			LW band	Moscow, Soviet Union, now Russia	1931–1941		Mechanical television	
USSR TV (ТВ СССР)	Первый канал	49.75 MHz (video) 56.25 MHz (audio)	TV channels:R1 (441 lines 25 fps)	Moscow, USSR, now Russia	1938–1941, 1945-1949	Ministry of Culture	Electronic television	Now SECAM, PAL also DVB
Doświadczalna Stacja Telewizyjna	Telewizja Polska		TVP channels: TVP1, TVP2, etc.	Warsaw, Poland	1935–1939 (test broadcasting: 1937–38)		Mechanical television	Now PAL and DVB
Call sign (original)	Call sign (current)	Frequency*	Channel (current)	Location (city)	On air	Owner (original)	Original broadcast system	Current broadcast system

== See also ==
- Timeline of the BBC
- History of television
- Timeline of the introduction of television in countries
- Timeline of the introduction of color television in countries
- Geographical usage of television
- Oldest radio station
- List of experimental television stations
- Narrow-bandwidth television
- Television systems before 1940

=== Individual television stations ===
- WRGB
- WNBC
- WCBS-TV
- KCBS-TV
- BBC / BBC Television

=== Broadcast television systems ===
- Television systems before 1940
- NTSC
- PAL
- SECAM
