= FSTV =

FSTV may refer to:

- Fast-scan television in Amateur TV, as opposed to slow-scan television
- Free Speech TV, in Denver
