= Cynwyl Elfed transmitting station =

Cynwyl Elfed
- Mast height: 12 metres (39 ft)
- Coordinates: 51°55′15″N 4°21′49″W
- Grid reference: SN375273
- Built: 1989
- Relay of: Preseli
- BBC region: BBC Wales
- ITV region: ITV Cymru Wales

The Cynwyl Elfed television relay station is sited on high ground to the east of the village of Cynwyl Elfed to the north of Carmarthen. It was originally built in mid 1989 as a fill-in relay for UHF analogue colour television covering the village of Cynwyl Elfed and the surrounding community. It consists of a 14 m self-supporting lattice steel mast standing on a hillside which is itself about 115 m above sea level. The transmissions are beamed west to cover the target. The Cynwyl Elfed transmission station is owned and operated by Arqiva.

Cynwyl Elfed transmitter re-radiates the signal received off-air from Preseli about 20 km to the west. When it came, the digital switchover process for Cynwyl Elfed duplicated the timing at Preseli with the first stage taking place on 19 August 2009 and with the second stage being completed on 16 September 2009. After the switchover process, analogue channels had ceased broadcasting permanently and the Freeview digital TV services were radiated at an ERP of 2 W each.

== Channels listed by frequency ==
=== Analogue television ===
==== 5 June 1989 - 19 August 2009 ====
Cynwyl Elfed entered service on the same day as did the nearby repeater at Bronwydd Arms. Being in Wales, both transmitted the S4C variant of Channel 4.

Frequency	UHF	kW	Service
479.25 MHz	22	0.004	BBC One Wales
503.25 MHz	25	0.004	ITV1 Wales (HTV Wales until 2002)
527.25 MHz	28	0.004	BBC Two Wales
559.25 MHz	32	0.004	S4C

=== Analogue and digital television ===
==== 19 August 2009 - 16 September 2009 ====
The UK's digital switchover commenced at Preseli (and therefore at Cynwyl Elfed and all its other relays) on 19 August 2009. Analogue BBC Two Wales on channel 28 was first to close, and ITV1 Wales was moved to that channel for its final three weeks of service. The new digital BBC A mux then started up in 64-QAM and at full power (i.e. 2 W) on channel 25 which had been vacated in the shuffle.

Frequency	UHF	kW	Service	System
479.25 MHz	22	0.004	BBC One Wales	PAL System I
506.000 MHz	25	0.002	BBC A	DVB-T
527.25 MHz	28	0.004	ITV1 Wales	PAL System I
559.25 MHz	32	0.004	S4C	PAL System I

=== Digital television ===
==== 16 September 2009 - present ====
The remaining analogue TV services were closed down and the digital multiplexes took over on the original analogue channels' frequencies.

Frequency	UHF	kW	Operator
482.000 MHz	22	0.002	Digital 3&4
506.000 MHz	25	0.002	BBC A
530.000 MHz	28	0.002	BBC B
