= 567-line television system =

Early experimental television system

The 567-line television system was an experimental late 1940s proposal by Philips of the Netherlands for a European television system, with some test transmissions being made from Eindhoven.

The first mention of the system appeared in an article from 1938, published in the Philips' technical bulletin, on a transportable demonstration TV station, running an at 50 fields (25 frames) per second, but no more details were provided. Most of the technology was to be borrowed from the American 525-lines system, the difference being the reduction of horizontal scan frequency from 15,750 to 14,175 Hz. This would have meant that the American sound carrier frequency of 4.5 MHz above the picture carrier would have also been the standard for Europe, and hence a lot more common worldwide.

By 1950 some 567-line television sets were built and distributed to Philips employees for home testing.

The 567-line system was proposed for international use but never adopted. Russian engineers had already shown how 525-lines could be easily adapted to a higher resolution by breaking with American 6 MHz channel bandwidth restrictions and moving the sound carrier up from 4.5 to 6.5 MHz, along with 625-line scanning. This 625-line system was eventually approved as CCIR System D.

== Technical details ==
Technical details
Frame rate	Interlace	Field rate	Line/frame	Line rate	Visual b/w	Vision mod.	Sound mod.	Sound offset	Channel b/w	Vestigial sideband	Aspect ratio
25	2/1	50	567	14175 Hz	4.2 MHz	Neg.	FM	+4.5 MHz	6 MHz.	LSB cut @ -0.75 MHz	4:3
