= Freeze frame television =

Television in which fixed images are transmitted sequentially at a slow rate

Freeze frame television is television in which the frames of the video are transmitted as a sequence of still images at a rate far too slow to be perceived as continuous motion by human vision. The receiving device typically displays each frame until the next complete frame is available.

For an image of specified quality, e.g., resolution and color depth, freeze-frame television has a lower bandwidth requirement than that of full-motion television. For this reason, NASA, which refers to this technique as sequential still video, uses it on UHF when K_{u} band full-motion video signals are not available.

== See also ==
- Slow-scan television
- Narrowband television
