= NMG =

NMG can refer to:

- Nation Media Group, a Kenyan media company
- Nnamani Music Group, a music company
- NMG (radio station), of National Hurricane Center
- Nederlandsche Meisjes Gilde (Dutch Girls Guild), later merged into Scouting Nederland
- New Music Gathering, American conference/festival for contemporary music
- Neiman Marcus Group, American department store chain
- Myers Motors NmG (No More Gas), an electric car
- Nexstar Media Group, an American media company
