= Bronwydd Arms transmitting station =

Television relay station in Wales

Bronwydd Arms
- Mast height: 12 metres (39 ft)
- Coordinates: 51°53′23″N 4°18′19″W
- Grid reference: SN414237
- Built: 1989
- Relay of: Carmel
- BBC region: BBC Wales
- ITV region: ITV Cymru Wales

The Bronwydd Arms television relay station is sited on high ground to the west of the village of Bronwydd to the north of Carmarthen. It was originally built in mid 1989 as a fill-in relay for UHF analogue colour television covering the village of Bronwydd Arms and the surrounding community. It consists of a 14 m wooden telegraph pole standing on a hillside which is itself about 85 m above sea level. The transmissions are beamed east to cover the target. The Bronwydd Arms transmission station is owned and operated by Arqiva.

Bronwydd Arms transmitter re-radiates the signal received off-air from Carmel about 30 km to the southeast. When it came, the digital switchover process for Bronwydd Arms duplicated the timing at Carmel with the first stage taking place on 26 August 2009 and with the second stage being completed on 23 September 2009. After the switchover process, analogue channels had ceased broadcasting permanently and the Freeview digital TV services were radiated at an ERP of 2 W each.

== Channels listed by frequency ==
=== Analogue television ===
==== 5 June 1989 - 26 August 2009 ====
Bronwydd Arms entered service on the same day as did the nearby repeater at Cynwyl Elfed. Being in Wales, both transmitted the S4C variant of Channel 4.

Frequency	UHF	kW	Service
471.25 MHz	21	0.008	BBC One Wales
495.25 MHz	24	0.008	S4C
519.25 MHz	27	0.008	BBC Two Wales
551.25 MHz	31	0.008	ITV1 Wales (HTV Wales until 2002)

=== Analogue and digital television ===
==== 26 August 2009 - 23 September 2009 ====
The UK's digital switchover commenced at Carmel (and therefore at Bronwydd Arms and all its other relays) on 26 August 2009. Analogue BBC Two Wales on channel 27 was first to close, replaced by the new digital BBC A mux which started up in 64-QAM and at full power (i.e. 2 W) on that same channel.

Frequency	UHF	kW	Service	System
471.25 MHz	21	0.008	BBC One Wales	PAL System I
495.25 MHz	24	0.008	S4C	PAL System I
522.000 MHz	27	0.002	BBC A	DVB-T
551.25 MHz	31	0.008	ITV1 Wales (HTV Wales until 2002)	PAL System I

=== Digital television ===
==== 23 September 2009 - present ====
The remaining analogue TV services were closed down and the digital multiplexes took over on the original analogue channels' frequencies.

Frequency	UHF	kW	Operator
474.166 MHz	21+	0.002	BBC B
498.000 MHz	24	0.002	Digital 3&4
522.000 MHz	27	0.002	BBC A
