= Amateur television =

Transmission of video in amateur radio bands

Amateur television (ATV) is the transmission of broadcast quality video and audio over the wide range of frequencies of radio waves allocated for radio amateur (ham) use. ATV is used for non-commercial experimentation, pleasure, and public service events. Ham TV stations were on the air in many cities before commercial television stations came on the air. Various transmission standards are used, these include the broadcast transmission standards of NTSC in North America and Japan, and PAL or SECAM elsewhere, utilizing the full refresh rates of those standards. ATV includes the study of building of such transmitters and receivers, and the study of radio propagation of signals travelling between transmitting and receiving stations.

ATV is an extension of amateur radio. It is also called ham TV or fast-scan TV (FSTV), as opposed to slow-scan television (SSTV).

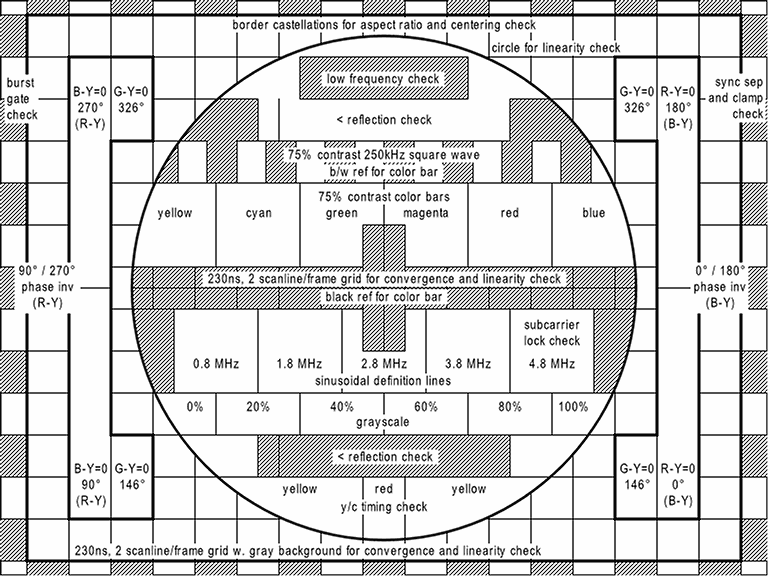
Signal circuit performance checks made when using a typical test card.

== North America ==
In North America, amateur radio bands that are suitable for a television signal (wide enough to fit such a signal) are higher in frequency than VHF broadcast TV. The lowest frequency ham band suitable for television transmission is 70 centimeters, which is between broadcast channels 13 and 14. While outside of broadcast television channels, this frequency falls into CATV frequencies, on channels 57 to 61 (IRC) (420–450 MHz). As such, ATV transmissions can be viewed by setting a television or analog cable-box to cable input and attaching an outdoor antenna. For more sensitive reception, some users may use a purposely-built ATV down-converter, which is a kind of set-top-box. Other bands are also used for ATV, most of them in the UHF region on frequencies higher than UHF broadcast TV. 33 centimeters and 23 centimeters are two other commonly used bands for ATV, but reception of these higher bands requires the use of a down-converter.

Most ATV signals are transmitted in either amplitude modulation (AM) or vestigial sideband (VSB) NTSC (North American analog TV broadcast modulation standard). DSB AM and VSB AM signals are inherently compatible with each other, and most televisions can receive either. DSB-AM signals consists of the carrier and both upper and lower sidebands. VSB-AM is where DSB-AM is filtered and the lower sideband is highly attenuated at frequencies more than 1.25 MHz from the carrier signal. A VSB filter can be added to a DSB-AM transmitter to make it a VSB signal. The filters, depending on power usage, will cost anywhere from US$100–1,000. For practical reasons, most individual ATV users transmit in DSB-AM, and VSB is transmitted by repeater stations. On the 33 cm and higher bands, frequency modulation (FM) ATV may be used, and on the SHF and EHF ham bands, FM is more commonly used than VSB or AM. FM ATV is incompatible with AM/VSB ATV, and a separate demodulator, such as an analog satellite receiver, is necessary to receive signals.

=== 2 m band ===
The 2-meter band (144-148 MHz) lies within cable channel 18, but at 4 MHz wide, it is too narrow to fit the full 6 MHz bandwidth of an NTSC analog channel; its audio carrier lies outside the band. To be used as a television frequency, some narrow-bandwidth format incompatible with most televisions must be used and converted.

The 2-meter band is often used by ATV operators for coordination with each other via FM voice transmissions. Operators seeking an ATV contact might first attempt calling on a regionally recognized ATV liaison-frequency, commonly 144.34 MHz, then agree to an ATV frequency to use for the video transmissions. The 2 meter frequency may be used throughout the contact to talk back to the current station transmitting video. The receiving station(s) may suggest adjustments the sending station can make, such as antenna direction, to improve the quality of the video received.

=== 70 cm band ===
The 70-centimeter band (420-450 MHz) is the most commonly used ham band for ATV. Signals transmitted on this band usually propagate longer distances than on higher frequency bands, for a given transmitter power and antenna gain. The band falls between broadcast TV channels 13 and 14, which are 210–216 MHz and 470–476 MHz respectively. Propagation is similar to the lowest UHF TV broadcast channels.

Additionally, this band can be easily received by simply tuning any cable-ready analog television or cable-box to the cable TV channels below and connecting an outdoor TV antenna. Amateur TV signals are much weaker than broadcast TV, so a preamplifier is often used to improve reception.

Analog CATV (IRC) channel	Channel Bandwidth (MHz)	Video Freq (MHz)	Audio Freq (MHz)	Notes
57	420–426	421.25	425.75	1,2
58	425–431	426.25	430.75	1,3
58	426–432	427.25	431.75	1
59	432–438	433.25	437.75	
59	432.75–438.75	434.00	438.50	3
60	438–444	439.25	443.75	6
61	444–450	445.25	449.75	4

Usage notes:

1. In Canada and areas of the US north of a designated "Line A" boundary, amateurs are not allowed to transmit on these channels.
2. Usually used as an ATV repeater output. VSB filters must be used on this channel to keep the signal inside the ham band.
3. Channels 58 and 59 are often offset in frequency to limit interference to the weak-signal and amateur radio satellite sub-bands (431–433 & 435–438 MHz respectively). Many modern CATV receivers can still lock-on to frequencies offset as much as 1 MHz.
4. Rarely used today due to heavy FM repeater use in this range.
5. To remain within the amateur radio bandwidth allocation, a maximum of two channels may be simultaneously used within a given geographic area, and the video carrier frequencies must be at least 12 MHz apart for the signals not to interfere with each other.
6. May not be used within 160 kilometers of Joint Base Cape Cod to protect PAVE PAWS.

=== 33 cm band ===
The 33-centimeter band (902-928 MHz) is next highest frequency ham band available for ATV in North America. This ham band is unique to ITU Region 2, and it is rarely available for amateur use in ITU Regions 1 or 3. This band is also shared with many users, including ISM devices and unlicensed Part 15 users, so interference issues are more likely than on other bands.

These channels can be received by many newer analog cable-boxes and televisions, which can tune to channels above 125.

Analog CATV (IRC) channel	Channel Bandwidth (MHz)	Video Freq (MHz)	Audio Freq (MHz)	Notes
143	906–912	907.25	911.75	1
N/A	909–915	910.25	914.75	
N/A	910–916	911.25	915.75	
144	912–918	913.25	917.75	
145	918–924	919.25	923.75	
N/A	922–928	923.25	927.75	2,3

Usage notes:

1. Available, but no known usage.
2. In portions of Colorado and Wyoming, amateurs are not allowed to transmit ATV on this channel.
3. May interfere with growing FM use on the 927–928 MHz sub-band.
4. For technical reasons, a maximum of two channels may be simultaneously used within a given geographic area, and the video carrier frequencies must be at least 12 MHz apart for the signals not to interfere with each other.

Additionally 33 cm is the lowest frequency band on which higher-quality frequency modulated amateur TV occurs. This format gives better picture quality than standard AM television. The FM television format used is identical to big dish analog satellite television and can be received by some tuners which can tune this low in frequency. Otherwise a specialized FM amateur TV receiver is needed.

=== 23 cm band ===
The 23-centimeter band (1.24-1.3 GHz) is the third-lowest frequency band available for ATV. Analog big-dish satellite television (TVRO) receivers may be re-purposed for inexpensively receiving ATV in this band. Such receivers can decode FM television when an outdoor antenna is connected to the LNB input. Due to the low cost and ease of repurposing old analog satellite receivers, this is the most popular band for FM amateur TV.

Commonly used 23 cm FM channels:

- 1.255 GHz
- 1.265 GHz

This band is also used for AM/VSB television, although this requires a specialized receiver.

Channel Bandwidth (GHz)	Video Freq (MHz)	Audio Freq (MHz)	Notes
1.24 – 1.246	1.24125	1.24575	1
1.252 – 1.258	1.25325	1.25775	3
1.264 – 1.27	1.26525	1.26975	
1.276 – 1.282	1.27725	1.28175	
1.288 – 1.294	1.28925	1.29375	

Usage notes:

1. VSB filters must be used on this channel to keep the signal inside the ham band.
2. All of the video carrier frequencies are 12 MHz apart to allow for each channel to be used simultaneously in a given geographic area without causing interference to each other.
3. Not available in certain New England states due to interference with the FAA's surveillance radar at Cummington, Massachusetts.

=== Other amateur radio bands ===
In addition to the above, there are other ham bands which are less commonly used for ATV:

- On the 13-centimeter band:
  - 2.4175 GHz is used for ATV links.
  - 2.4415 GHz is the band's most used FM ATV frequency. A 6.0 MHz audio sub-carrier and 4 MHz deviation are used.
- The 9 centimeter (3.4 GHz) and 5 centimeter (5.8 GHz) bands have ATV links in some areas.
- On the 3-centimeter band, 10.4 GHz is a wideband FM channel, and it may be used as an ATV repeater input.

=== Other information ===
The distance record for ATV is between Hawaii and California (2,518 miles) on 434 MHz.

Experiments with digital modes have lagged somewhat behind those in Europe, but have taken on some new urgency given the transition of broadcast television. WR8ATV currently has an output using DVB-S, which is believed to be the first DATV repeater in the US.

There is now a DATV downlink on the ISS operating in the amateur 2.4 GHz band. The QO-100 geostationary satellite wideband transponder has DATV uplinks in the 2.4 GHz and downlinks in 10 GHz amateur bands.

== Europe ==
In Europe, which generally has a narrower 70 cm allocation than the USA, the majority of amateur television operation is currently frequency modulated on 1.3 GHz and above. The frequencies in use depend on national permissions. In most of mainland Europe, the most common frequency is 1.255 GHz. Other bands commonly used for ATV are the 13cm (~2.3–2.45 GHz) and 3-cm (~10 GHz) bands, although ATV is used on most of the microwave bands.

In several countries cross-band repeaters are used, with AM inputs on 430 MHz and FM outputs on 1.255 GHz, others have FM-ATV inputs on 13 cm and outputs on 3 cm.

In the United Kingdom, much activity occurs using in-band repeaters. These generally have an input of 1.248, 1.249 or 1.255 GHz and typically output at 1.308, 1.312 or 1.316 GHz, although other frequencies are also used. Simplex operation occurs on these or other frequencies chosen to avoid interference with other users of the band, e.g. 1.285 GHz. Recent experiments have been done with digital modes following widely adopted DVB-S and DVB-T standards. These new DATV transmissions need less spectrum bandwidth than FM-ATV and offer superior picture quality. However, the unavoidable processing delays caused by the temporal compression mean that DATV signals have a second or more of time lag, which can make real-time video conversations feel much less natural than the 'instantaneous' analogue system.

== Transmission characteristics ==
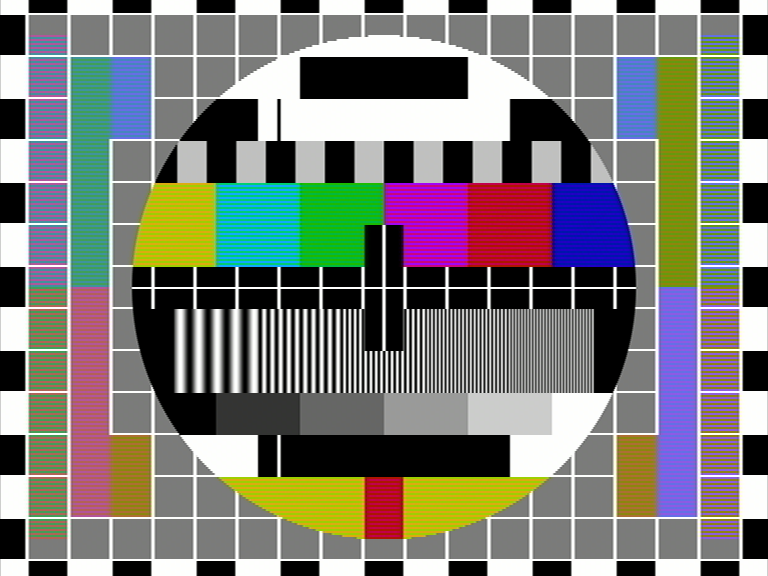
Typical fast scan test card showing "Hanover bars" (colour banding) effect in Pal S (simple) signal mode of transmission. Note: Hanover bars can only be seen in full size image.

Typically frequency modulated TV is used on frequencies above 1.24 GHz (1,240 MHz), where there is enough bandwidth for such wideband transmissions. This is often used as a repeater's input frequency, with output being standard VSB on the four channels listed above.

In a nutshell

- below 1.24 GHz: Vestigial Sideband
- above 1.24 GHz: FM, PSK etc...

The quality of transmission is expressed as a "p level"; "p" standing for "picture". P levels range from zero to five, increasing as the picture becomes more viewable. P-0 signifies a state in which sync bars are visible, but the picture is too snowy to be seen; this occurs at a minimum signal strength of 3 dB. Each level represents an increase of 6 dB over the previous; P-5 is 30 dB above P-0 and represents a perfectly clear picture.

=== Range ===
As transmission frequency increases, atmospheric path losses become greater, particularly at frequencies above 10 GHz. Additionally, long-distance propagation by F-layer ionospheric skip over the horizon does not typically occur at higher frequencies, and terrain and man-made structures can affect propagation of signals, blocking or redirecting signals. Factors such as E-layer skip propagation, tropospheric enhancement, and knife-edge diffraction can extend the useful range of signals.

== Content ==
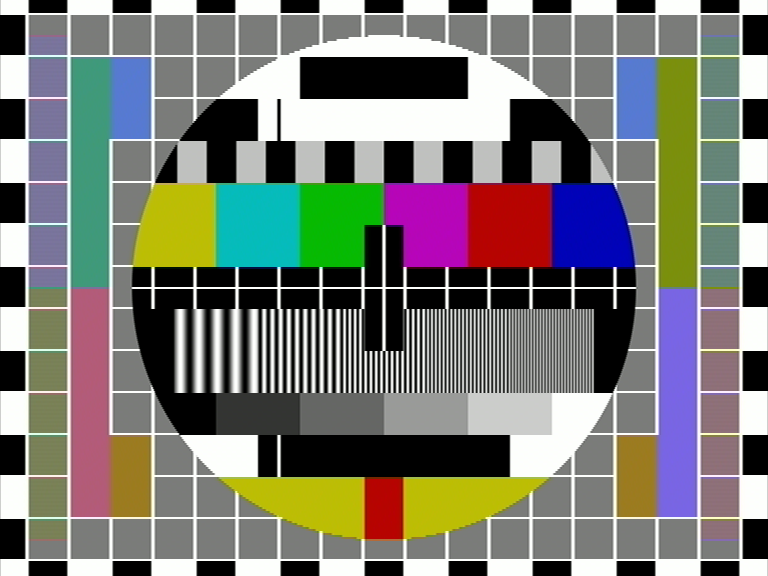
Test transmission signal for chrominance and luminance signals check using PAL D (delay line) encoding - colour "hanover Bars" effect no longer visible.

Content produced by ATV has included:

- From 1968 to about 2004 amateur TV provided behind-the-scenes co-ordination for the annual New Year's Day Tournament of Roses Parade in Pasadena, California.
- Ham TV (as it is also called) provides video co-ordination of many public service events and, along with traditional amateur radio, provides "eyes" in natural disasters.
- U.S. stations often retransmitted NASA TV while they were not in use, especially when there were Space Shuttle missions. NASA TV, as a work of the United States government, has no copyright and can be legally and freely retransmitted without permission, and has the advantage of not having to be manually programmed by the amateur station itself. In a similar vein, other public domain filler content can include television episodes and films with expired copyrights—especially silent films in scenarios where content without audio is needed—with the caveat that this content must be programmed.
- In recent history, amateur TV has found renewed interest in the radio-controlled hobby world as a method for transmitting FPV video, for use when flying remote control aircraft or piloting other RC vehicles.

== See also ==
- ATSC Standards
- DVB-T
- NTSC
- SECAM
- SSTV
- Narrow-bandwidth television
