= Radiofax =

Analogue mode for transmitting monochrome images

Radiofacsimile, radiofax or HF fax is an analogue mode for transmitting grayscale images via high frequency (HF) radio waves. It was the predecessor to slow-scan television (SSTV). It was the primary method of sending photographs from remote sites (especially islands) from the 1930s to the early 1970s. It is still in limited use for transmitting weather charts and information to ships at sea.

== History ==
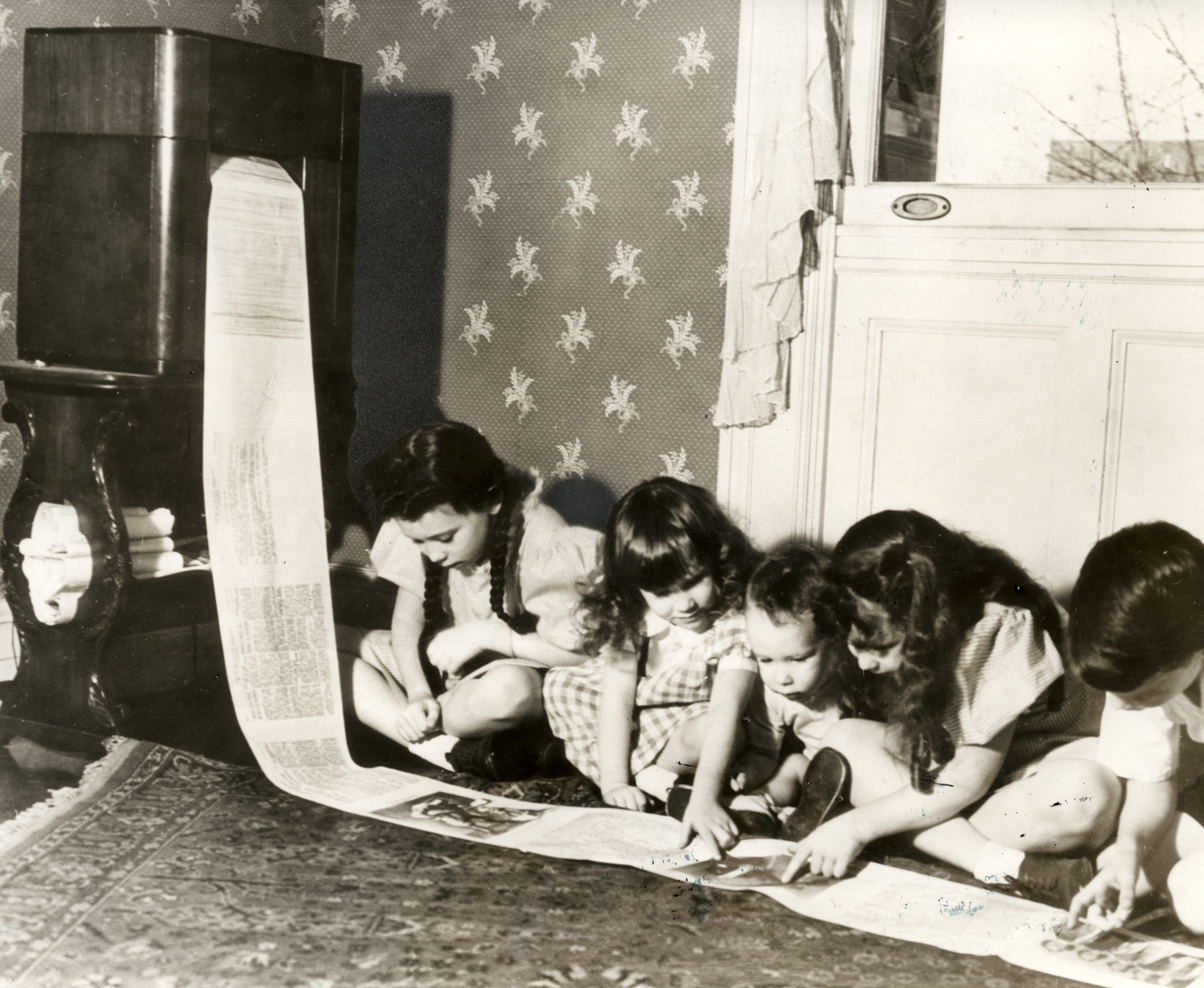
Children read a wirelessly-transmitted newspaper in 1938.

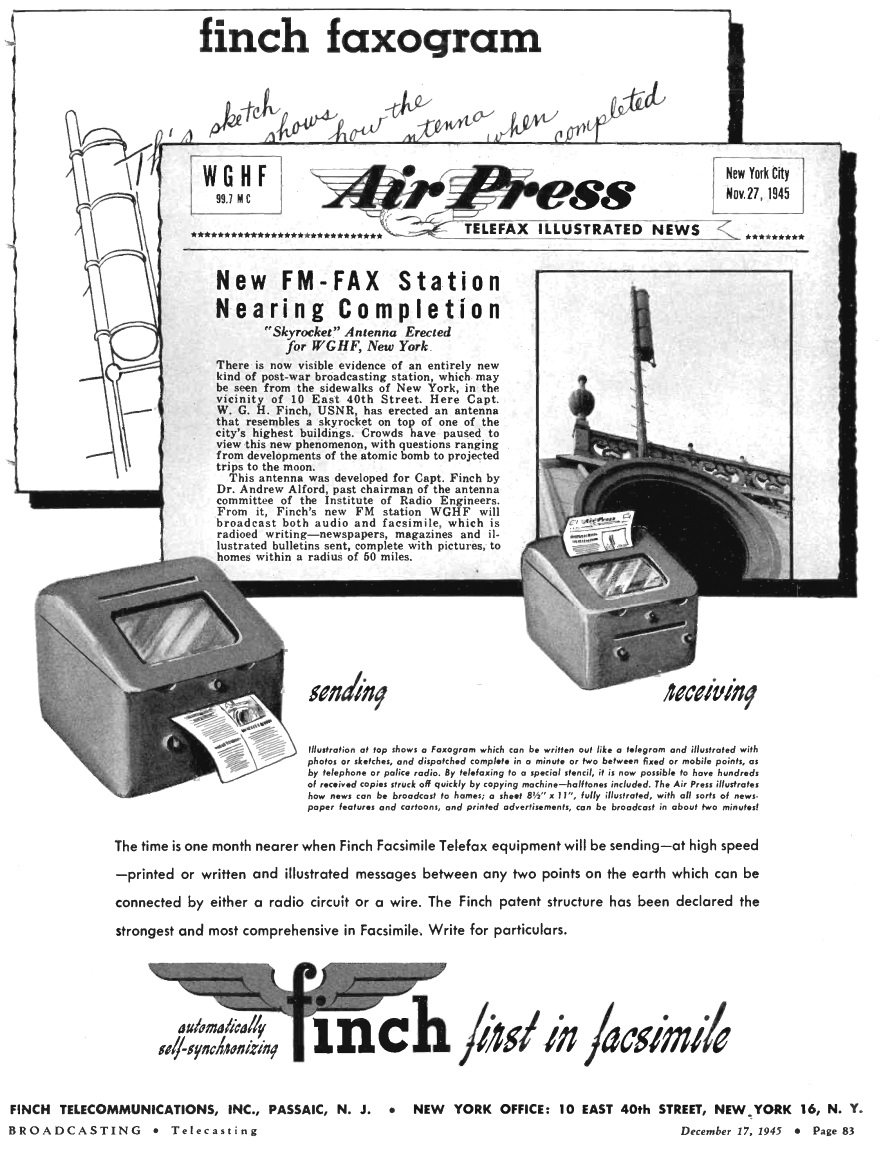
December 1945 advertisement for New York City FM station WGHF, featuring the station's experimental broadcast facsimile service using a subcarrier transmission

Richard H. Ranger, an electrical engineer working at Radio Corporation of America (RCA), invented a method for sending photographs through radio transmissions. He called his system the wireless photoradiogram, in contrast to the fifty-year-old telefacsimile devices which used first telegraphic wires, and then later was adapted to use the newer telephone wires.

On 29 November 1924, Ranger's system was used to send a photograph from New York City to London. It was an image of President Calvin Coolidge and was the first transoceanic radio transmission of a photograph. Also that year, AT&T engineer Herbert E. Ives transmitted the first color photograph.

Charles J. Young, son of the RCA founder Owen D. Young, and Ernst Alexanderson, developed a radio facsimile system for General Electric. On 12 August 1931 this system successfully transmitted a copy of the Union-Star newspaper of Schenectady, New York to the transatlantic liners America and Minnekahda. It took 15 minutes to copy a single page measuring 8 1/2 by 9 inches (220 by 230 mm).

Beginning in the late 1930s, the Finch Facsimile system was used to transmit a "radio newspaper" to private homes via commercial AM radio stations and ordinary radio receivers equipped with Finch's printer, which used thermal paper. Sensing a new and potentially golden opportunity, competitors soon entered the field, but the printer and special paper were expensive luxuries, AM radio transmission was very slow and vulnerable to static, and the newspaper was too small. After more than ten years of repeated attempts by Finch and others to establish such a service as a viable business, the public, apparently quite content with its cheaper and much more substantial home-delivered daily newspapers, and with conventional spoken radio bulletins to provide any "hot" news, still showed only a passing curiosity about the new medium.

During World War II thousands of photographs were transmitted from Europe, and from the Pacific Islands, to the United States. The major news agencies (AP, UPI, Reuters), maintained their own transoceanic radio facsimile transmitters as close to the action as they could. The iconic flag raising on Iwo Jima was printed in hundreds of American newspapers within a day of being taken, because it was transmitted from Guam to New York City by wireless radiofacsimile, a distance of 12,781 km (7,942 mi).

By the late 1940s, radiofax receivers were sufficiently miniaturized to be fitted beneath the dashboard of Western Union's "Telecar" telegram delivery vehicles.

In the 1960s, the United States Army transmitted the first photograph via satellite facsimile to Puerto Rico from the Deal Test Site using the Courier satellite.

== Weatherfax ==
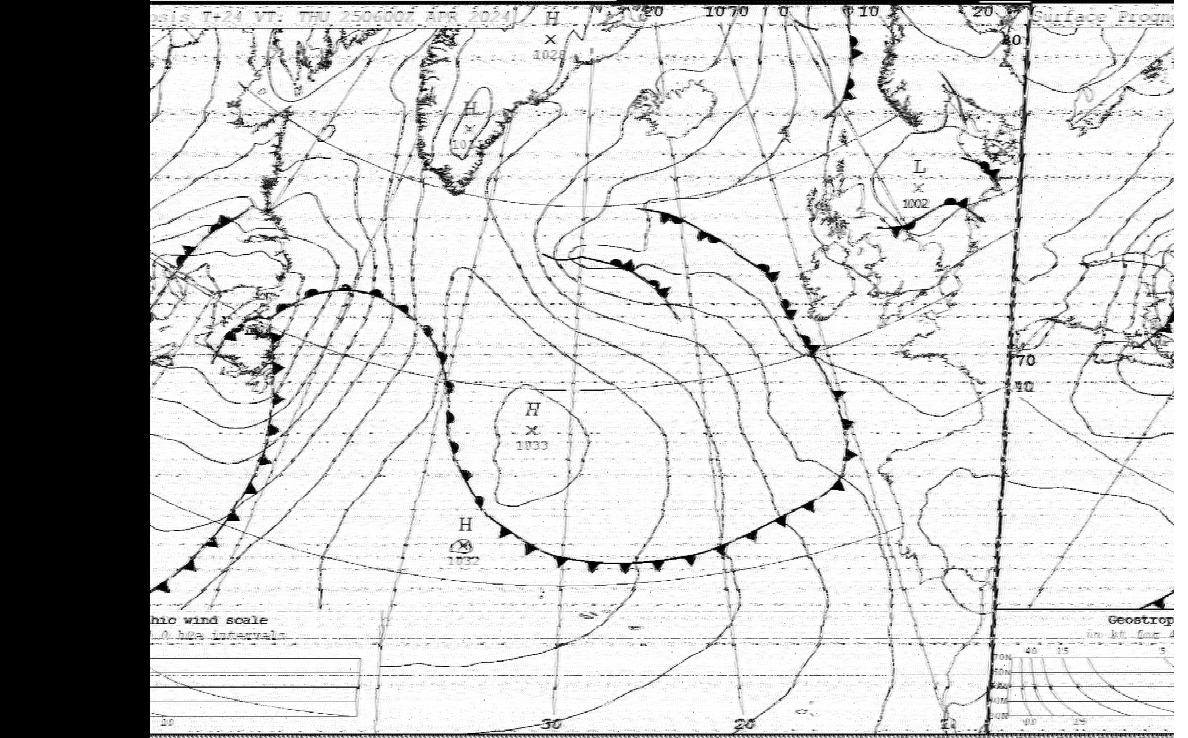
UK Marine Radiofax Broadcast, received on April 24, 2024

A decade after the introduction of radiofax National Weather Service (NWS) began transmitting weather maps using the radiofax technology. The NWS named this new service weatherfax (portmanteau word from the words "weather facsimile") The cover of the regular NOAA publication on frequencies and schedules states "Worldwide Marine Radiofacsimile Broadcast Schedules".

Facsimile machines were used in the 1950s to transmit weather charts across the United States via land-lines first and then internationally via HF radio. Radio transmission of weather charts provides an enormous amount of flexibility to marine and aviation users for they now have the latest weather information and forecasts at their fingertips to use in the planning of voyages.

Radiofax relies on facsimile technology where printed information is scanned line by line and encoded into an electrical signal which can then be transmitted via physical line or radio waves to remote locations. Since the amount of information transmitted per unit time is directly proportional to the bandwidth available, then the speed at which a weather chart can be transmitted will vary depending on the quality of the media used for transmission.

Today radiofax data is available via FTP downloads from sites in the Internet such as the ones hosted by the National Oceanic and Atmospheric Administration (NOAA). Radiofax transmissions are also broadcast by NOAA from multiple sites in the country at regular daily schedules. Radio weatherfax transmissions are particularly useful to shipping, where there are limited facilities for accessing the Internet.

The term weatherfax was coined after the technology that allows the transmission and reception of weather charts (surface analysis, forecasts, and others) from a transmission site (usually the meteorological office) to a remote site (where the actual users are).

== Newspaper fax ==
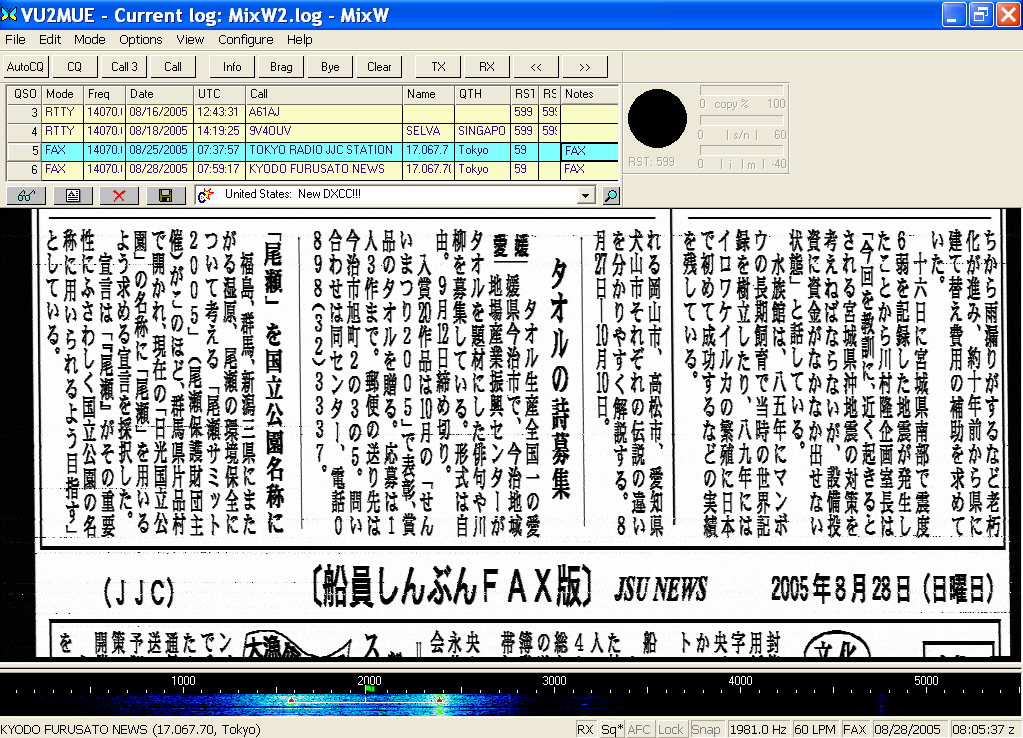
A marine radio fax news from Tokyo Radio JJC Station received using MIXW with a SSB HF communication receiver

Radiofax may also be used to transmit pages of newspapers. Stations like JJC use this way of transmitting news by using radio facsimile technology.

== Transmission details ==
Radiofax decoded

Radiofax is transmitted in single sideband which is a refinement of amplitude modulation. The signal shifts up or down a given amount to designate white or black pixels. A deviation less than that for a white or black pixel is taken to be a shade of grey. With correct tuning (1.9 kHz below the assigned frequency for USB, above for LSB), the signal shares some characteristics with SSTV, with black at 1.5 kHz and peak white at 2.3 kHz.

Usually, 120 lines per minute (LPM) are sent (For monochrome fax, possible values are: 60, 90, 100, 120, 180, 240. For colour fax, LPM can be: 120, 240). A value known as the index of cooperation (IOC) must also be known to decode a radio fax transmission - this governs the image resolution, and derives from early radio fax machines which used drum readers, and is the product of the total line length and the number of lines per unit length (known sometimes as the factor of cooperation), divided by π. Usually the IOC is 576.

== Automatic Picture Transmission format (APT) ==
APT format permits unattended monitoring of services. It is employed by most terrestrial weather facsimile stations as well as geostationary weather satellites.

- The start tone triggers the receiving system. It was originally meant to allow enough time for the drum of mechanical systems to get up to speed. It consists of rapid modulation of the video carrier, resulting in a characteristic rasp-like sound.
- The phasing signal, consisting of a periodic pulse, synchronizes the receiver so that the image will be centered on the paper.
- The stop tone, optionally followed by black, marks the end of the transmission.

Signal	Duration	IOC576	IOC288	Remarks
Start tone	5s	300 Hz	675 Hz	200 Hz for colour fax modes.
Phasing signal	30s			Black line interrupted by a white pulse.
Image	Variable	1200 lines	600 lines	At 120 lpm.
Stop tone	5s	450 Hz	450 Hz
Black	10s

== Stations ==
Today, radiofax is primarily used worldwide for the dissemination of weather charts, satellite weather images, and forecasts to ships at sea. The oceans are covered by coastal stations in various countries.

In the United States, fax weather products are prepared by a number of offices, branches, and agencies within the National Weather Service (NWS) of the National Oceanic and Atmospheric Administration (NOAA).

Tropical and hurricane products come from the Tropical Analysis and Forecast Branch, part of the Tropical Prediction Center/National Hurricane Center. They are broadcast over US Coast Guard communication stations NMG, in New Orleans, LA, and NMC, the Pacific master station on Point Reyes, California. After Hurricane Katrina damaged NMG, the Boston Coast Guard station NMF added a limited schedule of tropical warning charts. NMG is back at full capability, but NMF continues to broadcast these.

All other products come from the Ocean Prediction Center (OPC) of the NWS, in cooperation with several other offices depending on the region and nature of information. These also use NMG, NMC, and NMF, plus Coast Guard station NOJ in Kodiak, Alaska, and Department of Defense station KVM70 in Hawaii.

Ever since the loss of the RMS Titanic highlighted the dangers of icebergs in the North Atlantic, an International Ice Patrol has also originated weather data, and its charts are broadcast by the Boston station during the prime iceberg season of February through September, using the call sign NIK.

CBV, Playa Ancha Radio in Valparaíso, Chile broadcasts a daily schedule of Armada de Chile weather fax for the southeastern Pacific, all the way to the Antarctic. Also in the Pacific, Japan has two stations, as does the Bureau of Meteorology in Australia. Most European countries have stations, as does Russia.

Kyodo News is the only remaining news agency to transmit news via radiofax. It broadcasts complete newspapers in Japanese and English, often at 60 lines per minute instead of the more normal 120 because of the greater complexity of written Japanese. A full day's news takes dozens of minutes to transmit. Kyodo has a dedicated transmission to Pacific fishing fleets from Kagoshima Prefectural Fishery Radio, and a relay from 9VF/252, which is said to be located in Singapore. These transmitters are considerably more powerful than others used for this mode.

The German Meteorological Service (Deutscher Wetterdienst, DWD) transmits a regular daily schedule of weather charts on three frequencies 3.855 MHz, 7.88 MHz and 13.8825 MHz from their LF and HF transmitting facility in Pinneberg.

== History ==
- 1911: The first amplitude modulator for fax machines is patented, permitting transmission via telephone lines.
- 1913: Edouard Belin's Belinograph
- 1922: The first transatlantic facsimile services was provided by RCA.
- 1922–1925: RCA faxes photos across the Atlantic in six minutes; AT&T, RCA and Western Union develop "high-speed" fax systems. Arthur Korn's facsimile system is used to transmit, by radio, a photograph of Pope Pius XI from Rome to Maine, US. The picture is published the same day in the New York World newspaper—a major feat in an era when news pictures crossed the ocean by ship.
- 1925: AT&T wirephoto starts operations
- 1926: RCA radiophoto starts operations
- 1926: Rudolf Hell introduced the Hellschreiber.
- 1927: First Siemens-Karolus-Telefunken facsimile between Berlin and other European cities
- 1933: First tests of the Finch Facsimile system in New Jersey
- 1937: First broadcast of a radiofax newspaper, in the Minneapolis/St-Paul area
- 1939: W9XZY St. Louis delivers first daily newspaper by radio facsimile. More than 1,000 U.S. households are experimentally equipped with fax receivers that electronically print morning newspapers overnight.
- 1941: Fax is enlisted by the military to transmit maps, orders and weather charts during World War II.
- 1947: Alexander Muirhead's fax
- 1948: Western Union installs fax machines in "Telecar" telegram delivery vehicles.
- 1960: First SSTV test transmissions in the USA
- 1966: First photographs from the surface of the Moon, transmitted by Soviet Luna 9 using radiofax format, and decoded by a Daily Express receiver at Jodrell Bank Observatory
- 1972: First SSTV transmissions in Germany

== See also ==
- Hellschreiber
- NAVTEX
- Slow-scan television
