= 525 lines =

1940s American analog standard-definition television resolution standard

Analog TV standard by nation: countries using 525-line are in green.

525-line (or EIA 525/60) is an American standard-definition television resolution used since July 1, 1941, mainly in the context of analog TV broadcast systems. It consists of a 525-line raster, with 486 lines carrying the visible image at 30 (29.97 with color) interlaced frames per second. It was eventually adopted by countries using 60 Hz utility frequency as TV broadcasts resumed after World War II. With the introduction of color television in the 1950s, it became associated with the NTSC analog color standard.

The system was given their letter designation as CCIR System M in the ITU identification scheme adopted in Stockholm in 1961.

A similar 625-line system was adopted by countries using a 50 Hz utility frequency. Other systems, like 375-line, 405-line, 441-line and 819-line existed, but became outdated or had limited adoption.

The modern standard-definition digital video resolution 480i is equivalent to 525-line and can be used to digitize a TV signal, or playback generating a 525-line compatible analog signal.

== Analog broadcast television standards ==
The following International Telecommunication Union standards use 525-lines:

- CCIR System J
- CCIR System M

== Analog color television systems ==
The following analog television color systems were used in conjunction with the previous standards (identified by a letter after the color system indication):

- NTSC (NTSC-J and NTSC-M)
- PAL (PAL-M)
- SECAM (SECAM-M)

== Digital video ==
525-lines is sometimes mentioned when digitizing analog video, or when outputting digital video in a standard definition analog compatible format.

- 480i, a standard-definition television digital video mode.
- NTSC DVD
- NTSC Video CD
- Rec. 601, a 1982 standard for encoding interlaced analog video signals in digital video form.
- D-1, a 1986 SMPTE component digital recording video standard.
- D-2, a 1988 SMPTE composite digital recording video standard.

== See also ==
- 625 lines
- 480p
