= 625 lines =

Analogue television resolution standard

Analogue TV standard by nation: countries using 625-line are in blue.

625-line (or CCIR 625/50) is a late 1940s European analogue standard-definition television resolution standard. It consists of a 625-line raster, with 576 lines carrying the visible image at 25 interlaced frames per second. It was eventually adopted by countries using 50 Hz utility frequency as regular TV broadcasts resumed after World War II. With the introduction of colour television in the 1960s, it became associated with the PAL and SECAM analogue colour systems.

A similar 525-line system was adopted by countries using 60 Hz utility frequency (like the US). Other systems, like 375-line, 405-line, 441-line, 455-line, and 819-line existed, but became outdated or had limited adoption.

The modern standard-definition digital video resolution 576i is equivalent and can be used to digitise an analogue 625-line TV signal, or to generate a 625-line compatible analogue signal.

== History ==
At the CCIR Stockholm Conference in July 1948 a first 625-line system with an 8 MHz channel bandwidth was proposed by the Soviet Union, based on 1946-48 studies by Mark Krivosheev. This was initially known as the I.B.T.O. 625-line system.

At a CCIR Geneva meeting in July 1950, Dr. Gerber (a Swiss engineer), proposed a modified 625-line system using a 7 MHz channel bandwidth - informally known as the "Gerber Standard". The system was based on work by Telefunken and Walter Bruch, and was supported by Belgium, Denmark, Italy, Netherlands, Sweden, and Switzerland.

At a CCIR Geneva meeting in May 1951, the existing VHF broadcast standards were standardised. The older 405-line system was designated CCIR System A, the Gerber Standard was designated System B, the Belgian variant System C, and the I.B.T.O. standard System D.

In the 1960s, with the introduction of UHF broadcasts, new 625-line standards were adopted, again with slightly different broadcast parameters, leading to the creation of Systems G, H, I, K, and L.

== Analogue broadcast 625-line television standards ==
... The following International Telecommunication Union standards use 625-lines:

World analog 625-line television systems
ITU System Letter Designation	B	C	D	G	H	I	K	K1	L	N
Previous designation	Gerber Standard	Belgian 625-line system	I.B.T.O. 625-line system			TAC System				
Band	VHF			UHF		VHF/UHF	UHF	VHF/UHF		
Introduced	1950	1953	1948	1961	1961	1962	1961	1964	1961	1951
Channel bandwidth (MHz)	7		8							6
Video bandwidth (MHz)	5		6	5		5.5	6			4.2
Vision sound carrier separation (MHz)	+5.5		+6.5	+5.5		+5.9996	+6.5		-6.5	+4.5
Vestigial sideband (MHz)	0.75				1.25		0.75	1.25		0.75
Vision modulation (+, -)	-	+	-						+	-
Sound modulation (AM, FM)	FM	AM	FM						AM	FM
Frequency of chrominance subcarrier (MHz)	4.43	none	4.43							3.58
Vision/sound power ratio				5:1					8:1	
Usual colour	PAL/SECAM	none	SECAM/PAL	PAL/SECAM	PAL		SECAM/PAL	SECAM		PAL
Assumed display device gamma	2.8	2.0	2.8							

== Analog color 625-line television systems ==
The following analog television color systems were used in conjunction with the previous standards (identified by a letter after the colour system indication):

- PAL analogue colour television system (ex: PAL-B, PAL-D, etc.)
- SECAM analogue colour television system (ex: SECAM-D, SECAM-L, etc.)

== Digital video ==
625-lines is sometimes mentioned when digitising analogue video, or when outputting digital video in a standard-definition analog compatible format.

- 576i, a standard-definition television digital video mode.
- PAL region, a common term regarding video games, meaning regions where the 625-lines PAL standard was traditionally used.
- PAL/SECAM DVD
- PAL/SECAM Video CD
- Rec. 601, a 1982 standard for encoding interlaced analogue video signals in digital video form.
- D-1, a 1986 SMPTE component digital recording video standard.
- D-2, a 1988 SMPTE composite digital recording video standard.

== See also ==
- 525 lines
- 576p
