= NMG (radio station) =

Coordinates: 30.0210°N 90.1229°W

NMG is the callsign of the National Hurricane Center's Atlantic basin radiofax radio station. It broadcasts from the United States Coast Guard station in New Orleans, Louisiana with 4 kilowatts of power.

TAFB weather forecasts are transmitted full-time on the following frequencies:

- 4317.9 kHz
- 8503.9 kHz
- 12789.9 kHz.

NMG also broadcasts at 17146.4 kHz between 1200 and 2045 UTC.
