= Narrow-bandwidth television =

Broadcast in a smaller channel than typical transmissions

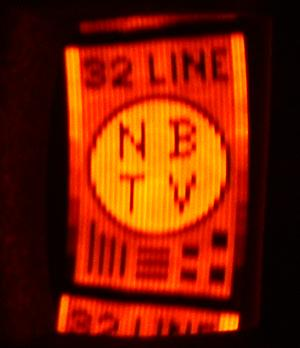
Screenshot of a NBTV testcard on a 32-line system

Narrow-bandwidth television (NBTV) is a type of television designed to fit into a channel narrower than the standard bandwidth used for official television standards.

The three predominant worldwide broadcast television standards use either 6 MHz wide channels (as in the Americas and Japan, as ATSC and ISDB-T both use those standards) or 8 MHz (as in most of Europe with DVB-T). Narrow-bandwidth television refers to any method that reduces the bandwidth below that threshold. (These techniques are frequently used in traditional television to allow for multiple digital subchannels on the same bandwidth, but this is not true narrow-bandwidth as the standards do not allow for it, and the extra bandwidth in these cases is usually transferred to another channel.)

== Design ==
There are three ways to reduce the bandwidth of a video signal: reduce the scan rate, reduce the image size, and/or (with digital television) use heavier compression. When the scan rate is reduced, this is referred to as slow-scan TV or, in the most extreme cases when the scan rate is too slow to simulate motion, freeze frame television. With reduced image sizes, this is referred to as low-definition television. In the most extreme cases, the number of lines in an image may be reduced to just a few dozen, and bandwidth reduced to a few tens of kilohertz, within the bandwidth of an amateur radio voice channel. Most narrow-bandwidth TV nowadays uses computers and other electronic systems.

== Mechanical TV standards ==
The earliest mechanical television systems often used narrow channels for sending moving images. Often, the images were only a few dozen lines in size.

Name	Details
Nipkow 1884	24 lines. Patent granted but Nipkow did not build a system.
WGY, 2XAF, 2XAD	24 lines, 21 frame/s, progressive scan
United Kingdom, 1926 (Baird)	30 lines, 5 frame/s, black-and-white experimental transmissions
United Kingdom, 1928 (Baird)	30 lines, 5 frame/s, first experimental colour TV transmissions
W3XK, Washington, D.C, 1928	48 lines. Oldest television station in the United States.
2XAL, WRNY "Radio News", New York, 1928	48 lines, 7.5 frame/s, progressive scan. Second to broadcast television pictures to the general public, after W3XK in Washington, D.C.,
Baird, United Kingdom, 1928–32	30 lines, 12.5 frame/s, 3:7 vertical aspect ratio, vertical progressive scan, ~70x30 pixels per frame, sound, live TV from studio, first outdoor remote broadcasts of the Derby
W9XAA/WCFL, W9XAO/WIBO, W9XAP/WMAQ (Western Television / Sanabria), Chicago, 1928–33	45 lines, 15 frame/s, 1:1 aspect ratio, triple interlace scan. Live TV from studio. (Above transmissions: Picture station / sound station)
W9XK/WSUI, Iowa City, Iowa (Used Western Television/Sanabria system), 1933–39	45 lines, 15 frame/s, 1:1 aspect ratio, triple interlace scan. Includes sound on WSUI. Educational TV pioneer. Live TV from studio.
Germany, France, 1930	30 lines, 12.5 frame/s, 3:4 aspect ratio, horizontal progressive scan
New York City, Schenectady, Boston, 1930–31	48 lines, 15 frame/s, 6:5 aspect ratio, horizontal progressive scan
W6XAO Los Angeles, 1931	80 lines, 20 frame/s, progressive scan
W6XAH Bakersfield, 1931	96 lines, 20 frame/s, progressive scan
New York, Schenectady, Boston, 1932	60 lines, 20 frame/s, 6:5 aspect ratio, horizontal progressive scan
Berlin 1932	30 lines, 12.5 frame/s, 4:3 horizontal aspect ratio, ~40x30 pixels per frame, test movies and live images
Königs Wusterhausen 1932	39 lines, 12.5 frame/s, 4:3 horizontal aspect ratio, ~31x30 pixels per frame, movies
Doberitz 1932	48 lines, 25 frame/s, 4:3 horizontal aspect ratio, ~64x48 pixels per frame, sound, talking movies
Berlin R.P.Z. 1932	60 lines, 25 frame/s, 4:3 horizontal aspect ratio, ~83x60 pixels per frame, test movies and live images
Italy 1932	60 lines, 20 frame/s, 4:3 horizontal aspect ratio, ~45x60 pixels per frame, test movies and live images
France 1932	60 lines, 12.5 frame/s, 3:7 vertical aspect ratio, vertical scanning ~35x60 pixels per frame, sound, live images
Switzerland 1932	30 lines, 16.6 frame/s, 4:3 horizontal aspect ratio, ~40x30 pixels per frame, test movies and live images
USSR 1932	30 lines, 12 frame/s
Belgium 1932	30 lines, 12.5 & 16.6 frame/s, 4:3 horizontal aspect ratio, ~40x30 pixels per frame, sound, talking movies

== See also ==
- History of television
- List of experimental television stations
- Prewar television stations
- Television systems before 1940
- PXL2000
