= 180-line television system =

1930s analog standard-definition television resolution standard

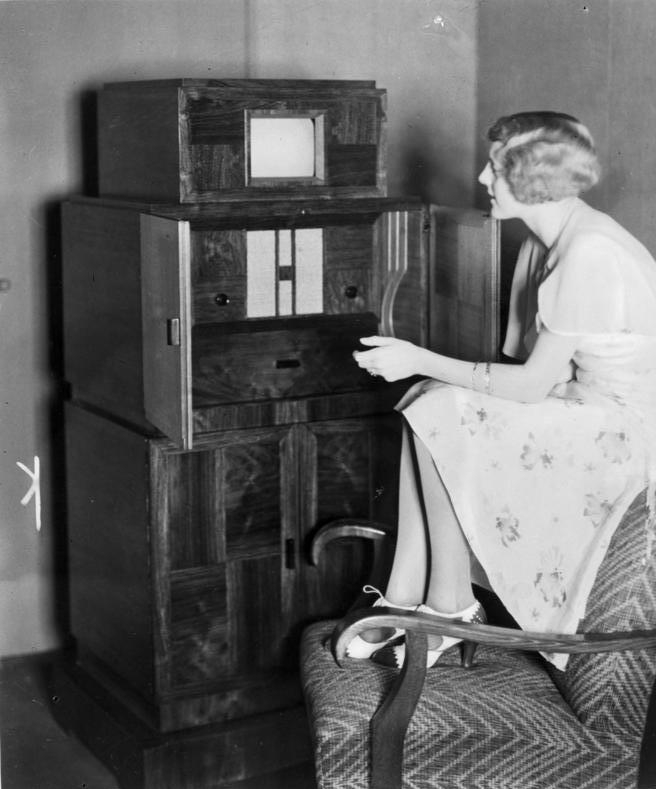
A 1933 photo of Telefunken's FE-II, a combined 180-line TV and radio receiver.

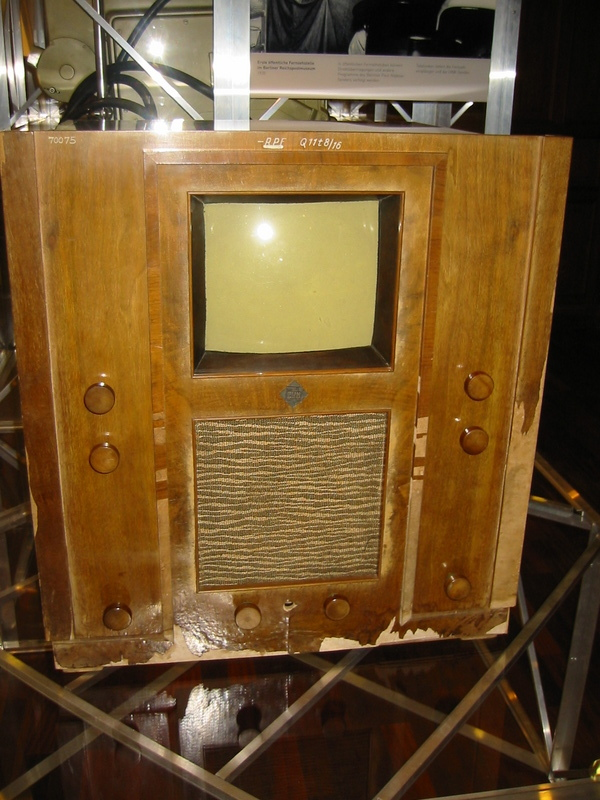
Telefunken FE III 180-line TV set from 1936.

180-line is an early electronic television system. It was used in Germany after March 22, 1935, using telecine transmission of film, intermediate film system, or cameras using the Nipkow disk. Simultaneously, fully electronic transmissions using cameras based on the iconoscope began on January 15, 1936, with definition of 375 lines.

The Berlin Summer Olympic Games were televised, using both closed-circuit 375-line fully electronic iconoscope-based cameras and 180-line intermediate film cameras transmitting to Berlin, Hamburg, Munich, Nuremberg, and Bayreuth via special Reichspost long-distance cables in August 1936. In Berlin, twenty-eight public 180-line television rooms were opened for anybody who did not own a television set.

180-line system details:
System	Field frequency	Active picture	Field blanking	No. of broad pulses	Broad pulse width	Line frequency	Front porch	Line sync	Back porch	Active line time	Video/syncs ratio
180-line	25 Hz	169 lines	11 lines	1 per field	200 μs	4500 Hz	2.2 μs	20.0 μs	2.2 μs	197.8 μs	75/25

Some TV sets for this system were available, including the French Grammont models, Telefunken FE II and FE III, and Fernseh Tischmodell

After February 1937, both 180- and 375-line systems were replaced by a superior, 441-line system.
