= 455-line television system =

1930s analog standard-definition television resolution standard

The 455-line standard, also known as 450-line, was a French black-and-white analog television broadcasting norm employed between 1937 and 1939. It was later replaced by the 441-line format, which remained in use until 1956.

== Historical Background ==
In 1931, in Paris, Georges Mandel, the Minister of Posts, provided support to the Compagnie des Compteurs (CdC) in conducting mechanical television experiments. Engineer René Barthélémy was granted a studio on Rue de Grenelle, Paris for this purpose. The resolution gradually increased from 30 to 60 lines and then to 180 lines by 1935, and the transmitter was located to the Eiffel Tower.

Robert Jardillier, the next Minister of Posts, launched in 1936 a call for tenders to provide television with higher definition, based on the iconoscope and electronic television. A test period would follow and enable the best standard to be chosen.

Broadcasts became regular from January 4, 1937, from 11 to 11:30 am and 8 to 8:30 pm on weekdays and from 5:30 pm to 7:30 pm on Sundays. Grammont performed its tests in 441 lines, the Compagnie Française de Télévision in 450 lines, and Thomson-Houston in 455 lines.

In July 1937, the administration chose the 455-line system designed by Thomson-Houston, followed by public demonstrations at the International Exposition of Art and Technology in Modern Life.

Broadcasts using the previous mechanical system continued alongside the new electronic system until April 10, 1938.

In July 1938, a decree of the Posts, Telegraphs, and Telephones Agency defined the French terrestrial television standard as transmitting on 455 lines VHF (46 MHz, positive visual modulation, 25 frames per second), to be adopted throughout France within three years. 455-line TV sets from brands like Pathe-Marconi, Philips, Radioindustrie, CdC, Grammont, and Emyradio began to be sold to the public.

In 1938, the transmitter, located at the Eiffel Tower, changed to this 455-line format, making it the most advanced and powerful broadcasting system in the world, boasting a transmission power of 30 kW. Radiodiffusion Nationale (RN Télévision) starts its broadcasts from Paris, and expansion for other cities like Lyon, Marseille and Bordeaux is planned. In the spring of 1939, tests are conducted in Lille.

The Rue de Grenelle studio closed on July 31, 1939, and after this point, Radiodiffusion Nationale only broadcast films, documentaries, and recorded news using telecine.

When France entered World War II on September 3, 1939, the military authorities ordered the cessation of broadcasts and took control of the Eiffel Tower transmitter. A few broadcasts were still broadcast episodically for transmitter maintenance purposes.

On June 6, 1940, the French Resistance took action to sabotage this equipment to prevent its use by the Nazis. However, in 1942, the occupying forces decided to repatriate the equipment for their Berlin station and replaced it with 441-line equipment.

== See also ==
- TF1
