= 375-line television system =

1930s analog standard-definition television resolution standard

375-line corresponds to two different electronic television systems, both using 375 scan lines. One system (monochrome, 50 fields per second, interlaced) was used in Germany after 1936 along with the 180-line system, being replaced in a few years by the superior 441-line system. It was also tested in Italy around the same time.

In the United States a completely different system (field sequential color, 120 fields per second, interlaced) was used for early color television broadcasts

== Germany ==
375-line (50 fps, interlaced) television was demonstrated in 1936 on the Berlin Funkausstellung. The system used electronic cameras for live exterior broadcasts.

The system was also used on experimental transmissions of the 1936 Summer Olympics (along with the 180-line system), using the Telefunken Iconoscope camera. A transmitter was set up in Berlin-Witzleben, broadcasting at 42.9 MHz. The Reichspost distributed the signal to major cities across Germany using cables.

After the Games transmissions continued to viewing rooms installed on post offices. Philips presented a radio/TV combo receiver for the system at the 1937 Berlin Funkausstellung, and Loewe also had a receiver available.

In the same year Telefunken demonstrated the 375-line system at the Paris Exposition Internationale des Arts et Techniques dans la Vie Moderne, displaying images taken from the exhibition's pavilion terrace.

== Italy ==
In Italy 375-line television transmissions were undertaken by Arturo Castellani in 1937, with daily broadcasts from Rome, between 6pm and 9:30pm on 6.9 meters (43.45 MHz) with a power of 2 kW.

== United States ==
In the spring of 1940, CBS staff engineer Peter Goldmark devised a system for color television, hoping to gain advantage regarding NBC and its black-and-white RCA system. The new system proposed by CBS was based on field sequential color and incompatible with existing sets but "gave brilliant and stable colors", while NBC developed a black and white compatible color TV system that was "crude and unstable but compatible".

After some tests with different line counts, on September 2, 1941, CBS announces a 375-line, 60 color frames per second system, requiring a horizontal scanning rate of 22,500 lines per second, and a vertical scanning rate of 120 fields per second (interlaced, giving a combined color picture frequency of 20 frames per second). The system was tested from CBS station WCBW New York, on June 1, 1941.

In 1945 CBS demonstrates color broadcast using test equipment and a 10 MHz bandwidth UHF channel. Later developments use higher line counts (525-line with 144 fields/second using 10 MHz video bandwidth and 441-line with 144 fields/second using 4 MHz video bandwidth are proposed in 1946), but system operation (field sequential, using a high bandwidth UHF channel) remained similar the 375-line tests.

Eventually it was shown to the general public on January 12, 1950, as the 405-line Field-Sequential Color System (FSC). The vertical resolution was 77% of monochrome, and the horizontal resolution was 54% of monochrome. The Federal Communications Commission adopted it on October 11, 1950, as the standard for color television in the United States, but it was later withdrawn.

The concept was revived by NASA in 1969 for the Apollo color TV cameras.
