= 441-line television system =

1930s analog standard-definition television resolution standard

441-line is the number of scan lines in some early electronic monochrome analog television systems. Systems with this number of lines were used with 25 interlaced frames per second in France from 1937 to 1956, Germany from 1939 to 1943, Italy from 1939 to 1940, Japan in 1939, as well as by RCA in the United States with 30 interlaced frames per second from 1938 to 1941. Broadcasts were planned in Finland for 1940, but eventually cancelled due to World War II. Some experiments with a similar system were carried out on the USSR in the 1930s.

== Germany ==
After trials with a 375-line system during the Berlin Olympic Games of 1936, by 1937 Germany had introduced a 441-line with 50 interlaced fields per second television system that replaced the previous 180 lines network relayed by a special Reichspost (National Post Office) cable network in the country's main cities (Berlin, Hamburg, Munich, Bayreuth, Nuremberg). The system's line frequency was 11.025 kHz and the broadcast frequencies were 46.0 MHz for vision and 43.2 MHz for sound, using a 4 MHz channel bandwidth. Its image aspect ratio was close to 1.15:1.

A project began in 1938 involving the National Post and several companies including Bosch, Blaupunkt, Loewe, Lorenz, TeKaDe and Telefunken that aimed to produce 10,000 receivers for the television system.

Telefunken marketed the FE V, announced in 1936, with a 26 x 21 cm screen and a tuning range of 38-60 MHz. The next year, 1937, the Heimprojektions-FSE was introduced, with a larger 50 x 40 cm screen, along with the FE VI with a 26 x 21 cm screen. In 1938, the Tischfernseher TF 1 was released, with a 20 x 17 cm screen and a tuning range of 40-55 MHz.

In 1937, Loewe created the FE-D, with a 24x20 cm screen and a tuning range of 35-55 MHz.

In 1938, TeKaDe created a single model, the FS38, with a 30 x 27 cm screen and a tuning range of 43-52 MHz. Other brands like Fernseh AG also created models like the DE 6, also introduced in 1938, with a 32 x 27 cm screen and a tuning range of 40-53 MHz

A single-channel TV receiver, the Einheitsempfänger E1 was created in 1939. It had a 29 cm (diagonal) screen, and consumed 185 watts when receiving television signals and 60 watts when receiving audio only. Only a few units were built before the outbreak of World War II.

Due to the onset of World War II, only about 50 devices were installed in military hospitals and various government departments. The transmitter's aerials in Berlin were destroyed during an Allied Forces' bombing in November 1943, but the station was also relayed by a special coaxial cable network to "wide screen" public "TV-rooms" (Fernsehstuben) so it carried on this way until 1944.

German 441-line TV system technical details:
Field frequency	Active picture	Field blanking	Broad pulses	Broad pulse width	Front porch	Line sync	Back porch	Active line time	Video/syncs ratio	Channel bandwidth	Visual bandwidth	Sound offset	Vision modulation	Sound modulation	Aspect ratio	Line frequency
50 Hz interlaced	383 lines	29 lines	8 per field	36.3 μs	1.0 μs	9.0 μs	6.3 μs	74.3 μs	70/30	4 MHz	2 MHz	2.8 MHz	Positive	AM	1.15:1	11025 Hz

441-line TV in Germany

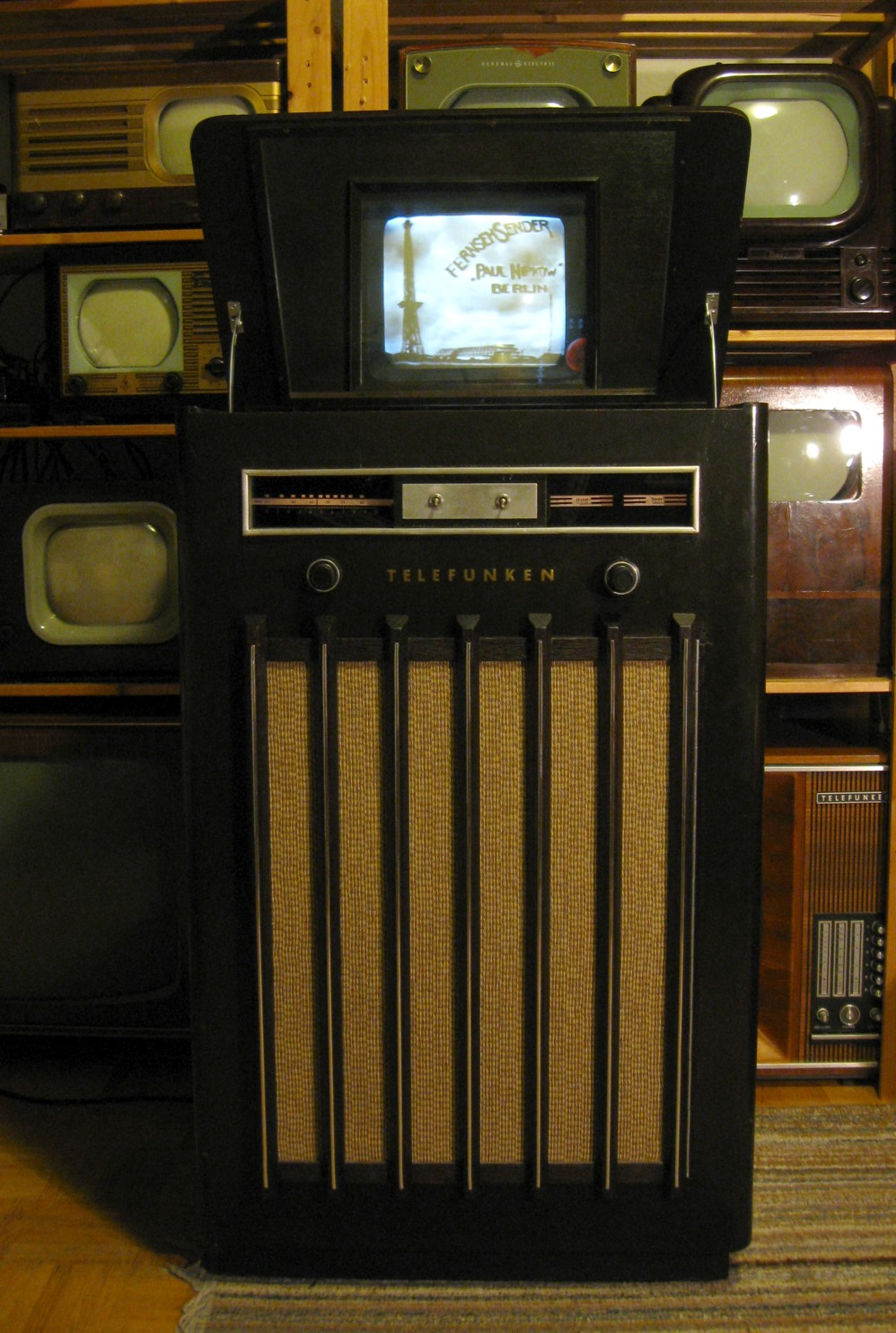
Telefunken FE V television (1936)

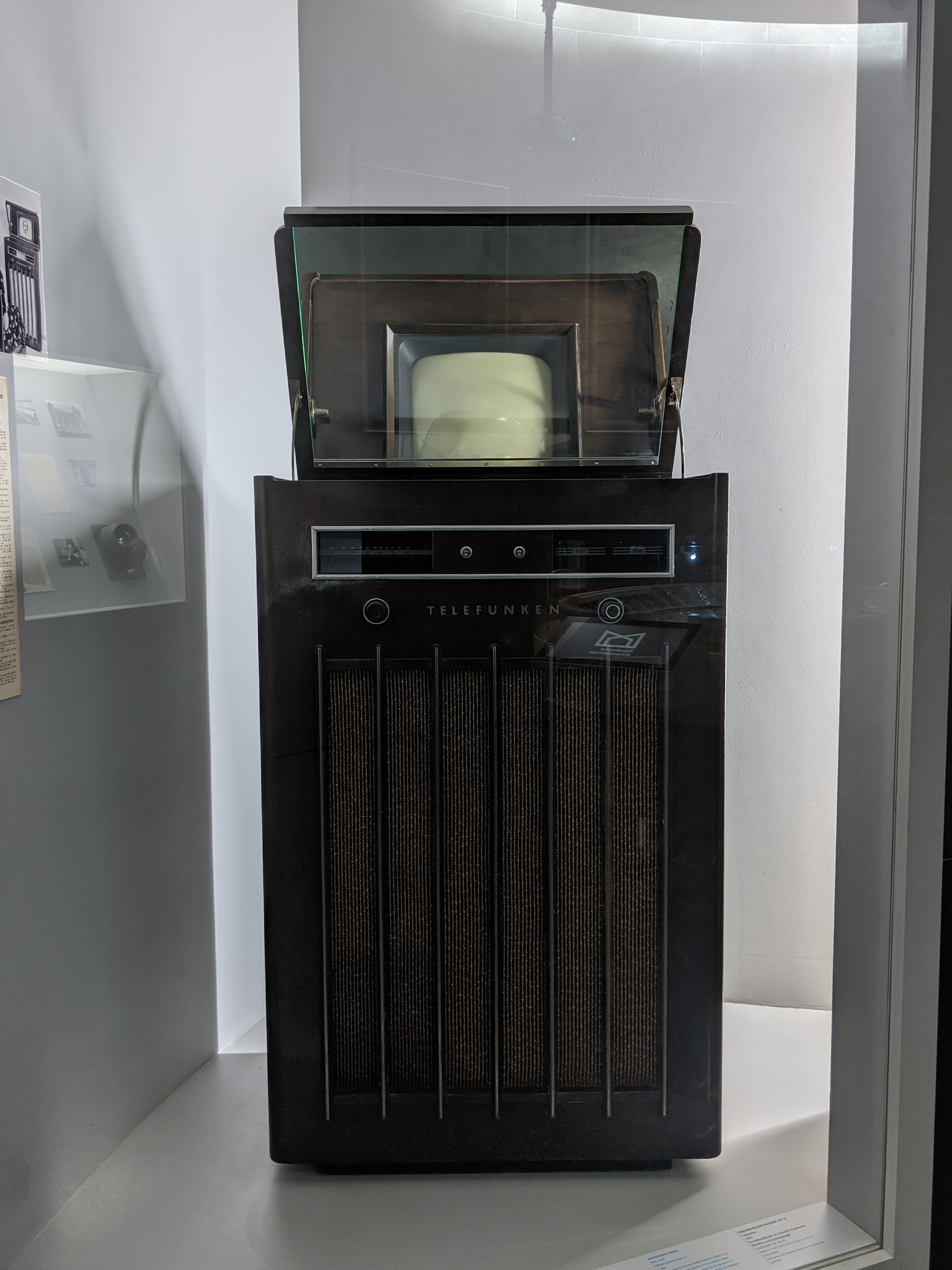
Telefunken FE VI television (1937)

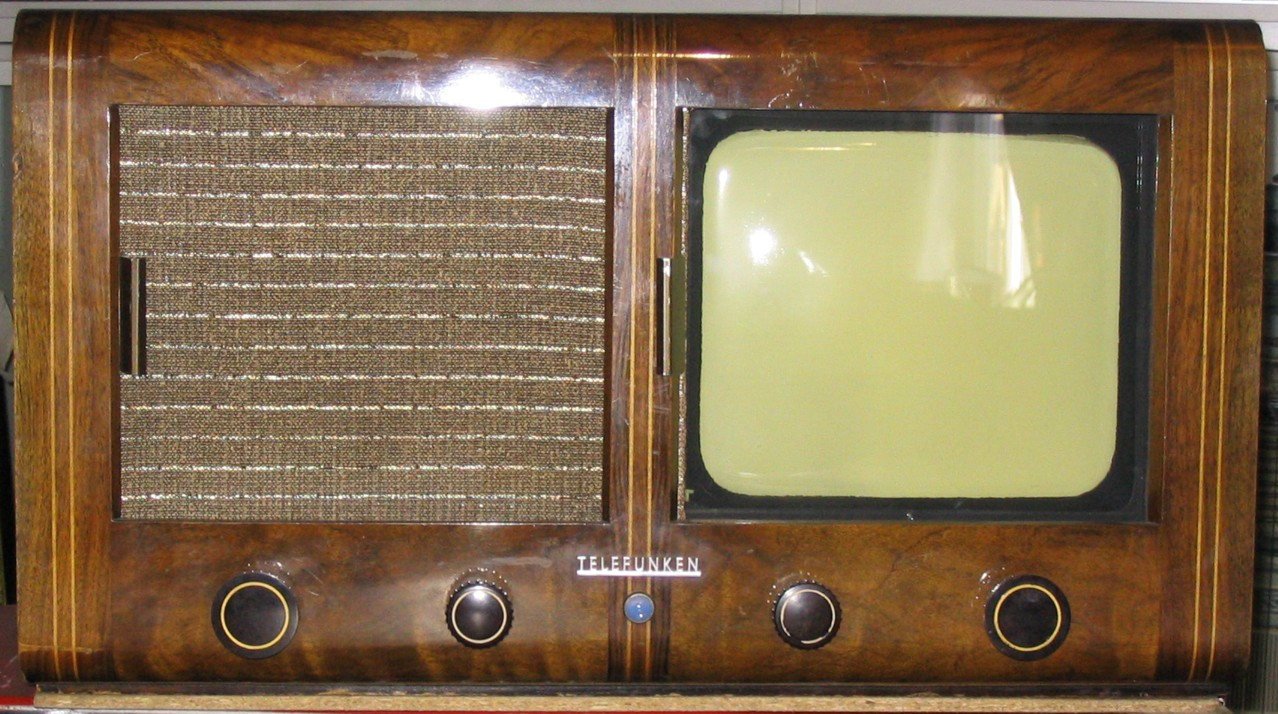
Einheitsempfänger E1 television (1939)

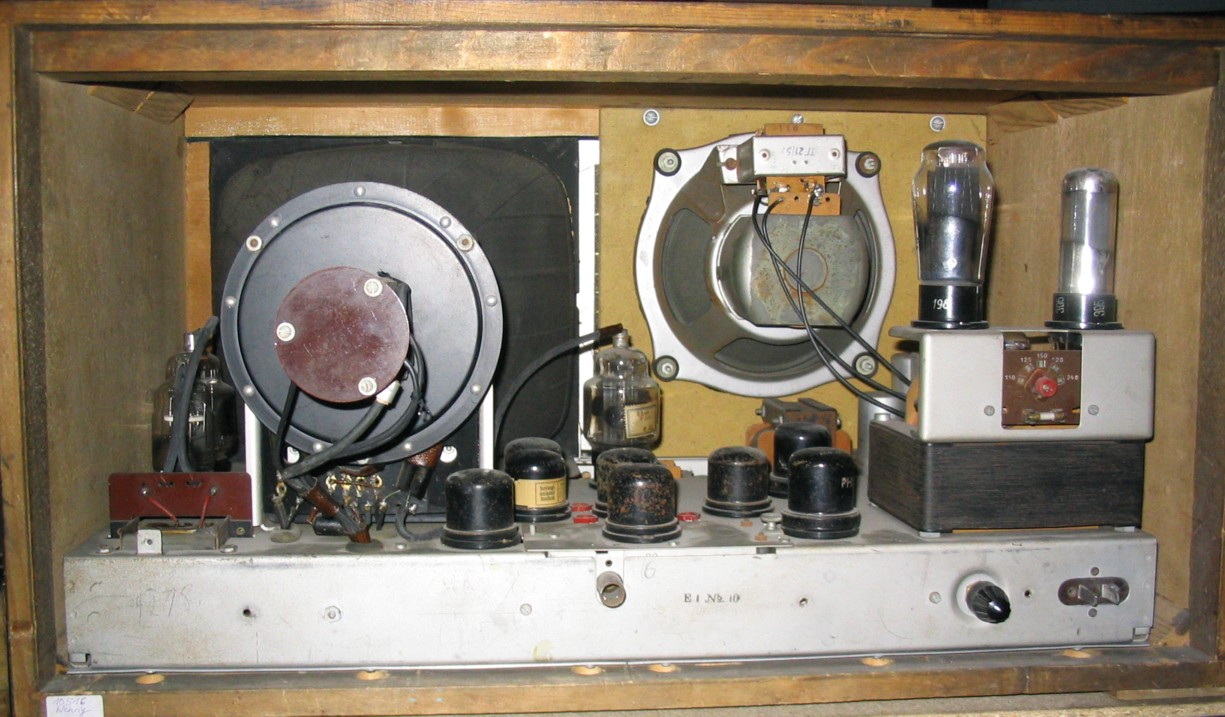
Einheitsempfänger E1 chassis (1939)

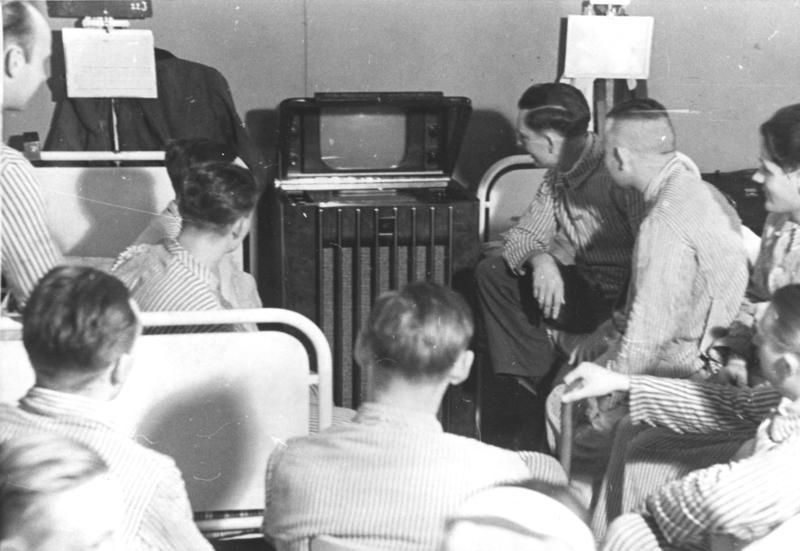
Television in a Berlin military hospital, setup by the German Reichspost (1942)

== France ==
By 1941 the "Fernsehsender Paris" station transmitted from the Eiffel Tower in Paris using the German 441-line system and its main technical characteristics, while however keeping the previous French 455-line broadcast frequencies 42 MHz - 46 MHz in use from 1938 to 1940, thus with a larger visual bandwidth than the station operating in Berlin. Television programs were mainly for wounded soldiers of the Wehrmacht occupation troops who recovered in the Greater Paris Area hospitals, but they also included French-language shows. Broadcasts were monitored in the United Kingdom during the Second World War to gather intelligence information from occupied France.

The line frequency was 11.025 kHz with vision broadcast at 46.0 MHz and sound at 42.0 MHz. Aerials were independent for audio and vision at the top of the Eiffel tower, both vertically polarized. No gain being obtained from these pre-war basic aerials, the effective radiated power was only the transmitter's peak one, i.e. 30 kW which enabled a good reception in a radius of 100 km (62 miles) around Paris. As displayed in J.M. Frost's WRTH (World Radio TV Handbook) editions at that time, the transmitter's frequencies (42-46 MHz) were listed as channel "F1" or channel "S" (or "Special" channel) in the European Broadcasting Union's official documents.

After July 1952 the 441-line transmitter was no longer broadcasting separate programs, but simply picked up the national network's picture through an 819 - 441-line "optical converter" (a 441-line camera, slightly out of focus, pointed at an 819-lines monitor equipped with an oval spotlight cathode ray tube). Broadcasts were due to cease on January 1, 1958, as the 819 lines standard had been adopted in 1948 for the national network. However, after a long elections coverage night, most of the 441-line equipment was destroyed by fire on January 3, 1956. It was decided to indemnify the 3,000 owners of remaining 441-line sets and to entitle them to reduced rates for their new 819 lines receivers.

French 441-line TV technical details:
Field frequency	Active picture	Field blanking	Broad pulses	Broad pulse width	Front porch	Line sync	Back porch	Active line time	Video/syncs ratio	Channel bandwidth	Visual bandwidth	Sound offset	Vision modulation	Vestigial sideband	Sound modulation	Aspect ratio	Line Frequency
50 Hz interlaced	383 lines	29 lines	8 per field	36.3 μs	1.0 μs	9.0 μs	6.3 μs	74.3 μs	70/30	7 MHz	3 MHz	4 MHz	Positive	3	AM	1.15:1	11025 Hz

== Italy ==
Following pre-war tests in 375 lines done by a Turin engineer named Arturo Castellani, broadcasts using the 441-line system began in Italy in 1939 with regular services from Rome using 2 kW power and Milan using 400 W of power in the frequency band of 40-45 MHz. As in France technical parameters – VHF frequencies excepted – were identical to those in use in Germany.

Broadcasts were discontinued on May 31, 1940.

== Japan ==
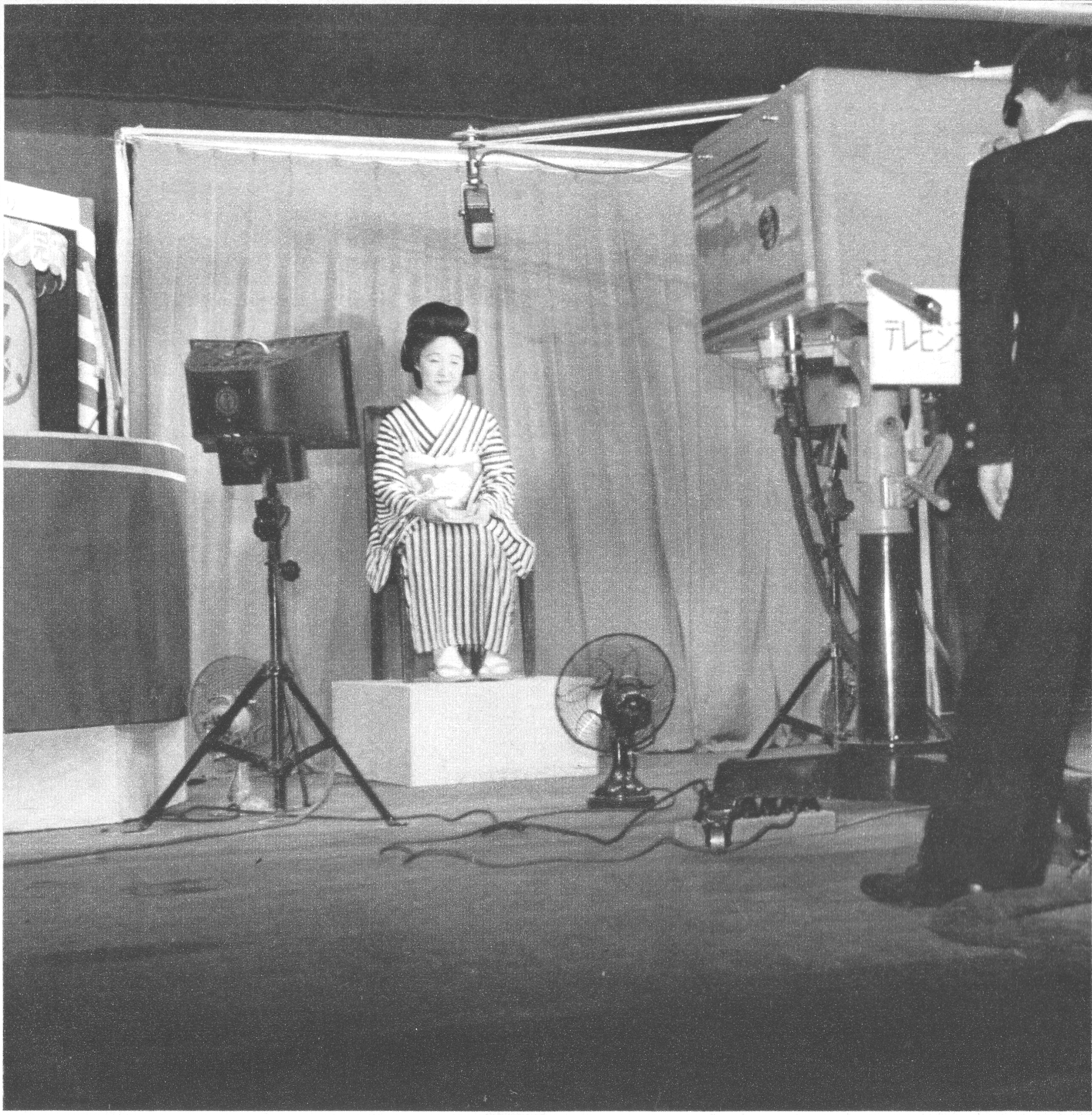
First television test broadcast transmitted by the NHK Broadcasting Technology Research Institute in May 1939

The first television tests in Japan were conducted as early as 1926 using a combined mechanical Nipkow disk and electronic Braun tube system, later switching to an all-electronic system in 1935 using a domestically developed iconoscope system.

Television broadcasting started on May 13, 1939, making the country one of the first in the world with an experimental television service. The broadcasts were in 441-lines with 25 frames/second and 4.5 MHz bandwidth. In spite of that, because of the beginning of World War II in the Pacific region, this first full-fledged TV broadcast experimentation lasted only a few months. Regular television broadcasts would eventually start in 1953, using a modified version of the American 525-line standard.

== United States ==
In September 1938 the Radio Manufacturers Association (RMA) recommended the 441-line system developed by RCA and Farnsworth Television. Tests started a year before, in an attempt to perfect a 343-line system, with RCA executives petitioning the FCC for approval of their new standard. In early 1938 Philco's experimental transmitter W3XE in Philadelphia was already using the system.

TV broadcasts were publicly launched in April 1939 by NBC, during the New York World's Fair, using the W2XBS station. The first pre-built TV receivers were sold on a very limited basis, mostly in New York City. Manufacturers included RCA, General Electric, DuMont, and Andrea Radio Corporation.

By June 1939, regularly scheduled broadcasts were available in New York and Los Angeles. By October nineteen TV broadcast licenses had been issued, including stations in New York, Philadelphia (W3XE), Chicago, Washington, Fort Wayne, Cincinnati, Schenectady (W2XB), Los Angeles and San Francisco.

By November General Electric's station in Schenectady started broadcasts. W2XBS in New York broadcast up to fifty-eight hours of programming per month until December 1939, to an estimate of 2,000 receiving sets. Reception area was a radius of 40-50 miles (80 km) from the Empire State Building.

Following a decision of the NTSC (National Television System Committee), the 525-line standard replaced the 441-line standard on July 1, 1941.

United States 441-line TV system technical details:
Field frequency	Channel bandwidth	Visual bandwidth	Sound offset	Vision modulation	Sound modulation	Aspect ratio	Line frequency
60 Hz interlaced	6 MHz	2.8 MHz	3.25 MHz	Negative	AM	4:3	13230 Hz

441-line TV in the United States

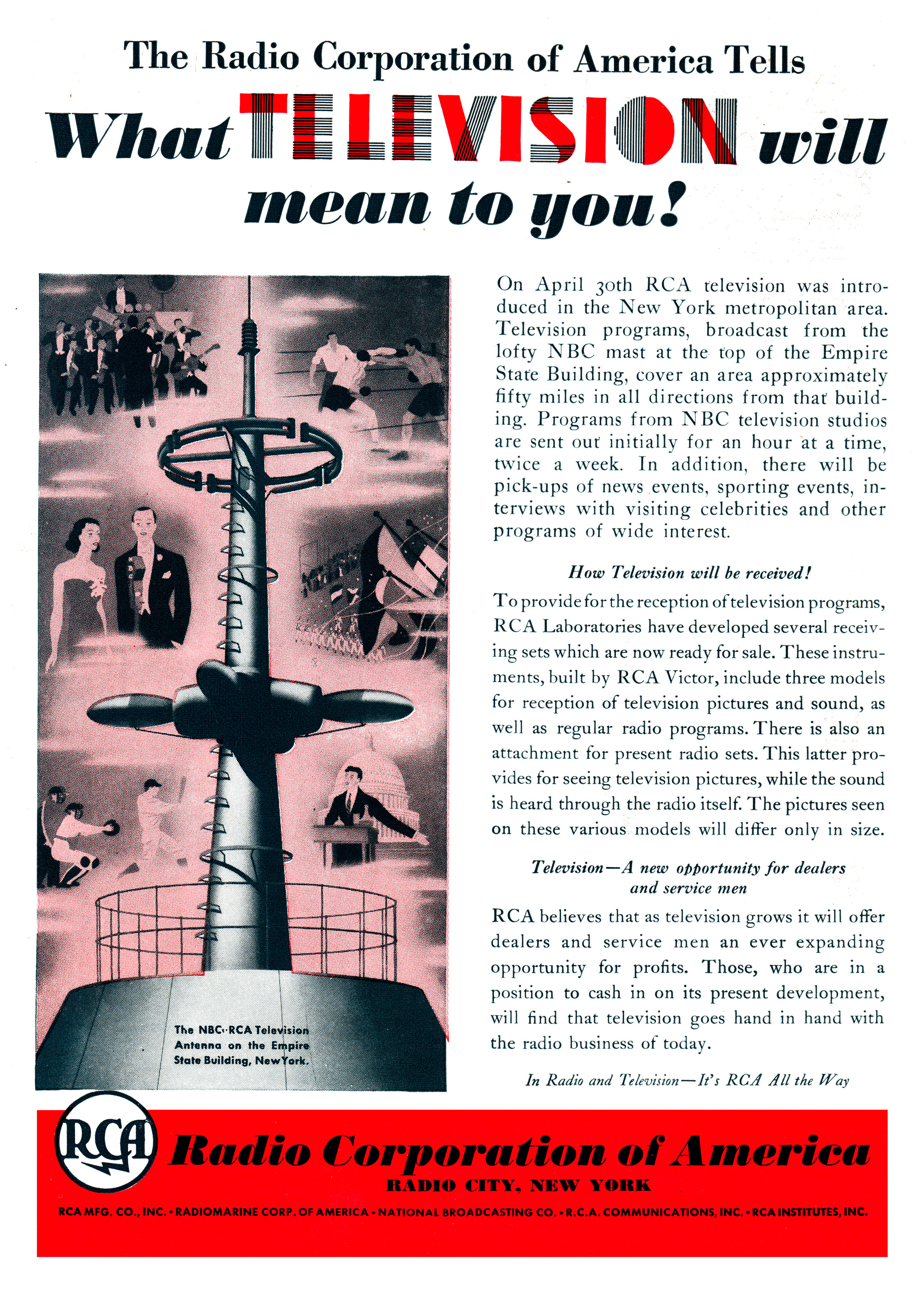
Ad for the beginning of RCA experimental television broadcasting (New York City, 1939)

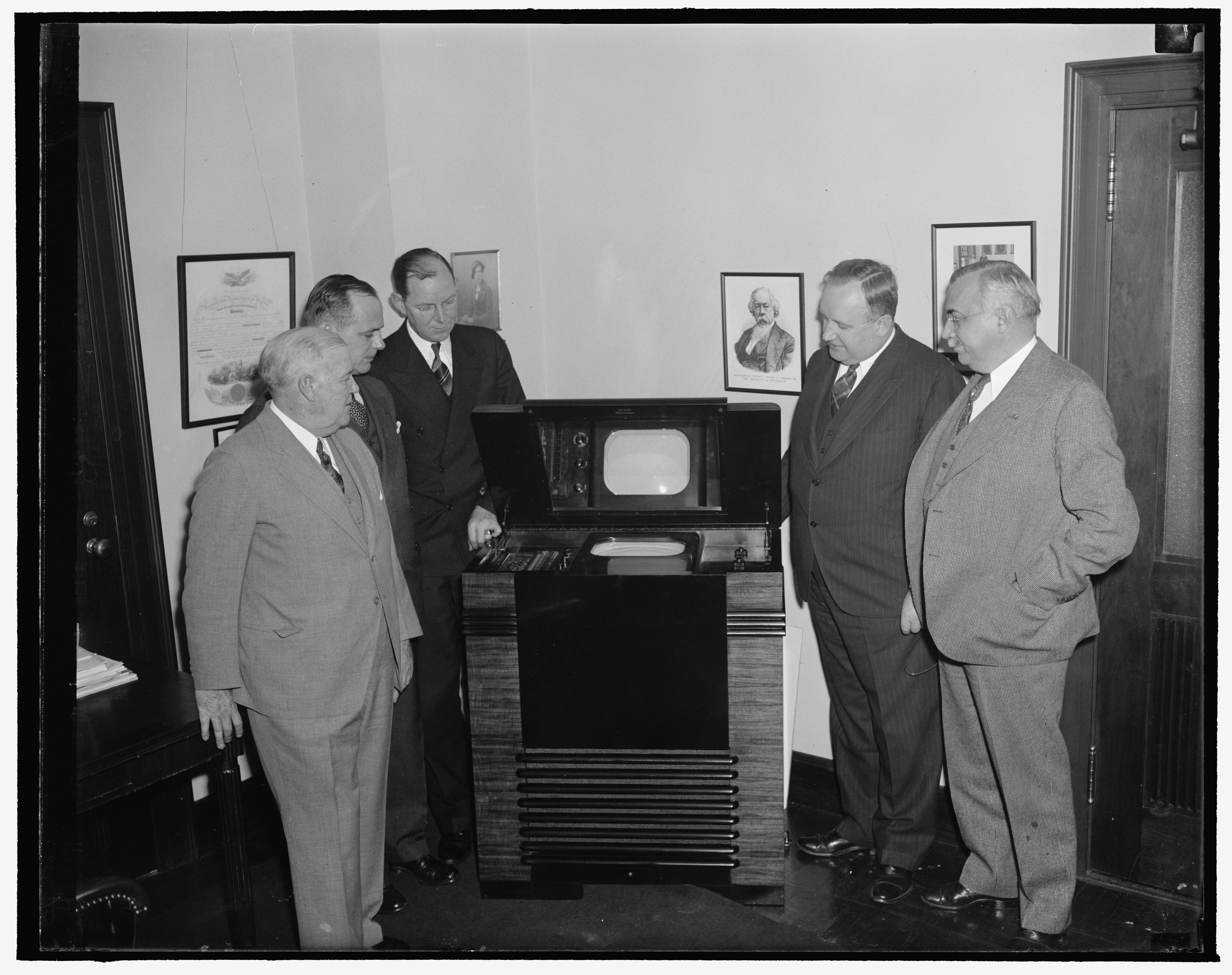
FCC inspects the latest in television (Washington, D.C., December 1, 1939)

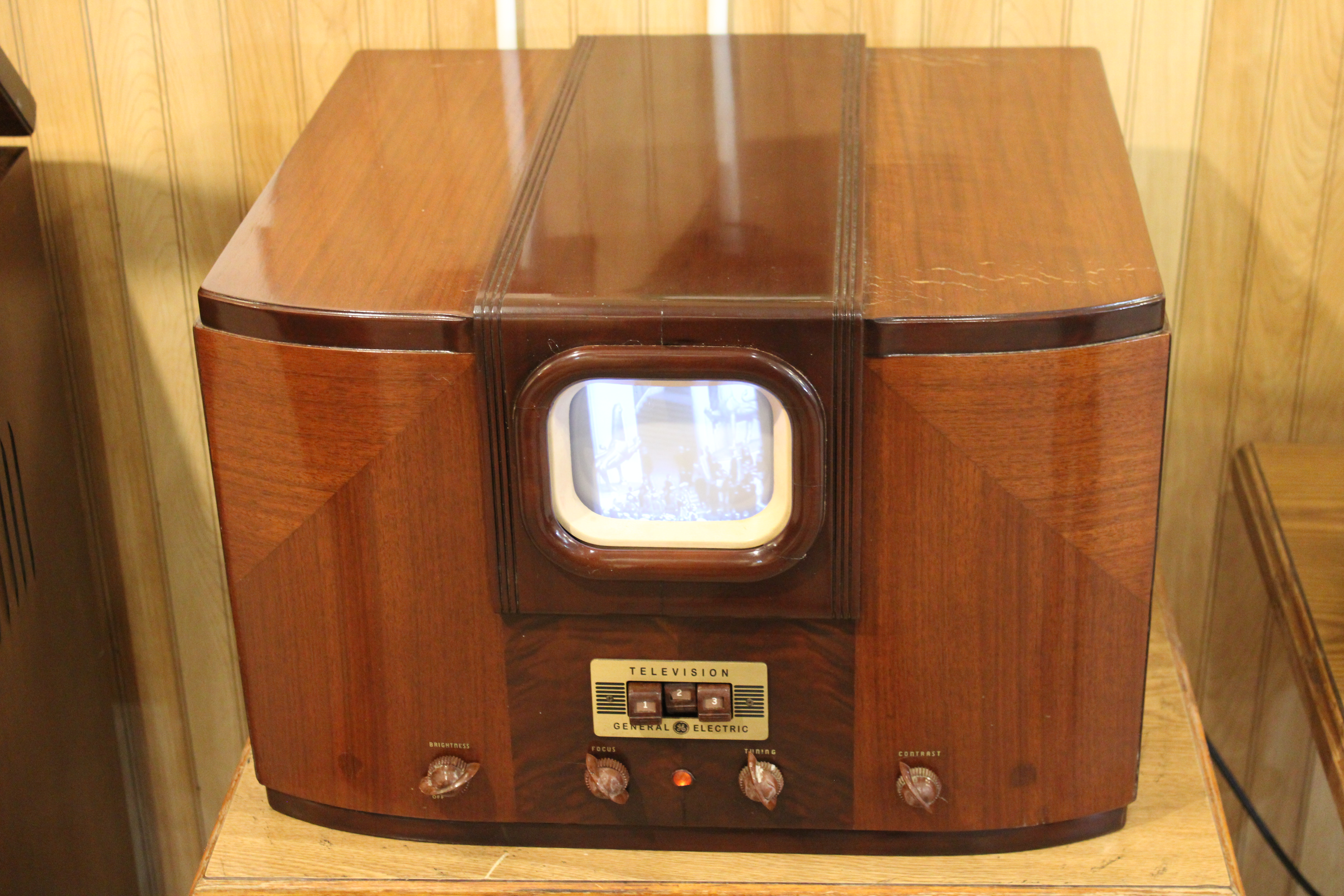
General Electric HM-171 television set

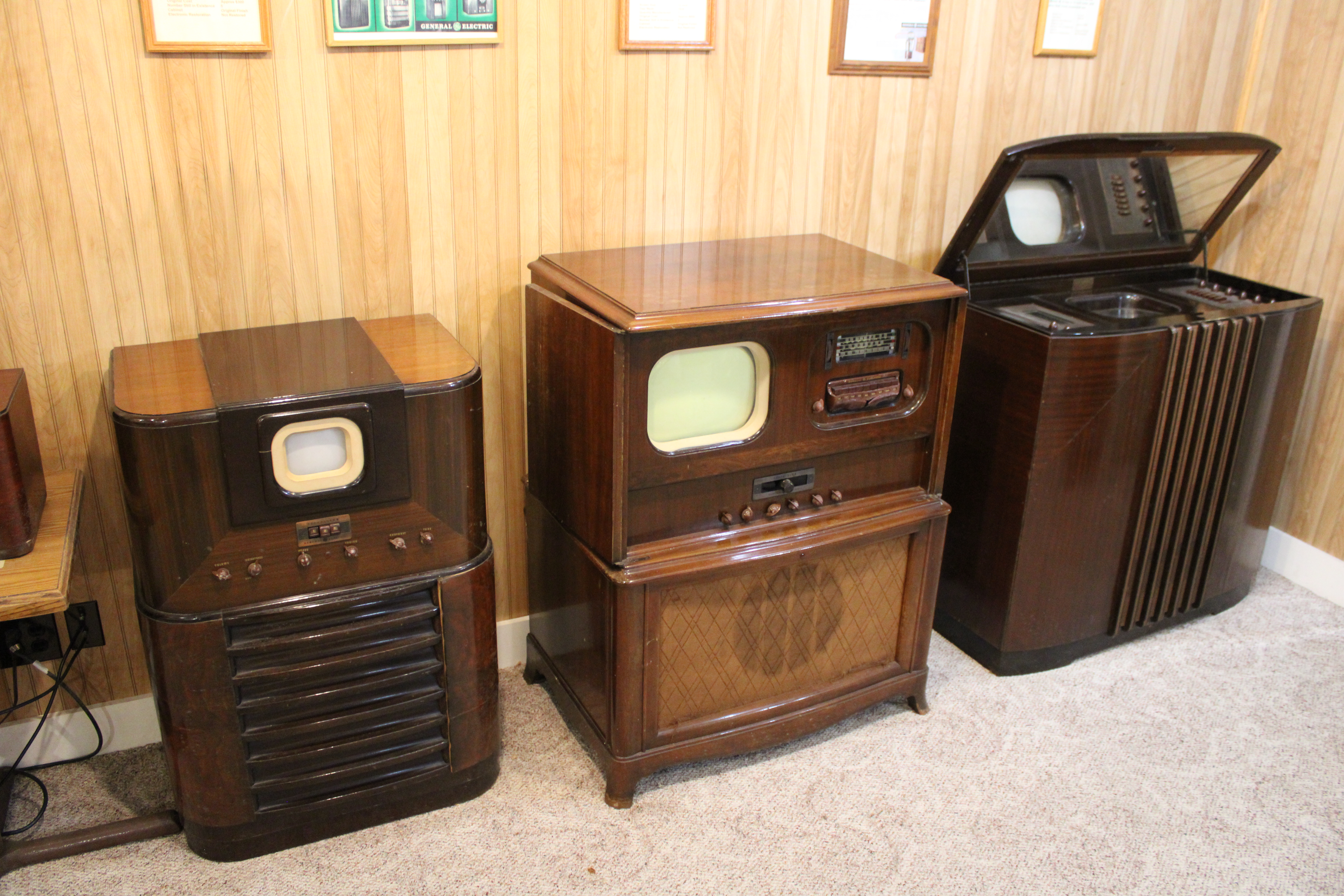
General Electric television sets from 1939: HM-185, HM-226-7A, and Model 90.

== Soviet Union ==
In the Soviet Union a specification for a 441-line system using 50 interlaced fields per second was proposed in 1940. Development of this system started in the 1930s, derived from test broadcasts from Moscow, using a 343-line system based on RCA equipment. Due to World War II the 441-line system never reached the broadcast stage.
