= 1927 in American television =

This is a list of American television-related events in 1927.

== Events ==
- January 7 – The American television pioneer Philo Farnsworth invented the first functional image dissector in 1927. He submitted a patent application on that day.
- April 7 –
  - A team from the Bell Telephone Laboratories demonstrated television transmission from Washington, D.C. to New York City, using a prototype array of 50 lines containing 50 individual neon lights each against a gold-appearing background, as a display to make the images visible to an audience.
  - Herbert E. Ives and Frank Gray of the Bell Telephone Laboratories gave a dramatic demonstration of mechanical television. The reflected-light television system included both small and large viewing screens. The small receiver had a 2 in (51 mm)-wide by 2.5 in (64 mm)-high screen. The large receiver had a screen 24 in (610 mm) wide by 30 in (760 mm) high. Both sets were capable of reproducing reasonably accurate, monochromatic moving images. Along with the pictures, the sets also received synchronized sound. The system transmitted images over two paths: first, a copper wire link from Washington, D.C. to New York City, then a radio link from Whippany, New Jersey. Comparing the two transmission methods, viewers noted no difference in quality. The subjects of the telecast included the Secretary of Commerce Herbert Hoover. A flying-spot scanner beam illuminated these subjects. The scanner that produced the beam had a 50-aperture disk. The disc revolved at a rate of 18 frames per second, capturing one frame about every 56 milliseconds. (Today's systems typically transmit 30 or 60 frames per second, or one frame every 33.3 or 16.7 milliseconds respectively.) Television historian Albert Abramson underscored the significance of the Bell Labs demonstration: "It was in fact the best demonstration of a mechanical television system ever made to this time. It would be several years before any other system could even begin to compare with it in picture quality."
  - Edna Mae Horner, an operator at the Chesapeake and Potomac Telephone Company, assisted the Bell Laboratories transmission and became the first woman on television; she helped guests in Washington, D.C., exchange greetings with the audience in New York City. Throughout the presentation, viewers in New York could see and hear Horner.
- September 7 – Philo Farnsworth's image dissector camera tube transmitted its first image, a simple straight line, at his laboratory at 202 Green Street in San Francisco.
- Specific date unknown – The American physicist Frank Gray proposed an early form of the flying-spot scanner for use in early TV systems.

== Sources ==
- Abramson, Albert (1987). The History of Television, 1880 to 1941. Jefferson, NC: McFarland & Co. ISBN 0-89950-284-9.
