= Timeline of television channels in the UK =

Timeline of television channels

This is the timeline of television channels in the United Kingdom.

== 1930s ==
- 1932
  - August 22 – The BBC launches their television service.
- 1936
  - November 2 – The BBC officially launches their television service (originally using both the Baird- and the EMI television systems).
- 1937
  - February 6 – The BBC switched from using both television systems, to using EMI's television system.
- 1939
  - September 1 – The BBC shut down their television service.

== 1940s ==
- 1946
  - June 7 – The BBC turned back on its television service.

== 1950s ==
- 1955
  - September 22 – Independent Television was launched (its first region was London weekday as Associated-Rediffusion).
  - September 24 – ATV London was launched (originally launched as ABC).
  - October 8 - ABC rebrands as ATV.
- 1956
  - February 17 – ATV expanded to the Midlands.
  - February 18 – ABC was launched in the Midlands.
  - May 3 – Granada was launched in the North West of England.
  - May 5 – ABC expanded to the North West of England.
