= Gustav Wikkenhauser =

Hungarian engineer and television pioneer

- Wikkenhauser Gustav
- Born: 1901; Budapest, Hungary
- Died: 1974 (aged 72–73); Essex, England
- Occupation: Engineer

Gustav Wikkenhauser (1901–1974) was a Hungarian engineer and television pioneer, naturalized as a British citizen in 1941.

== Early life ==
Wikkenhauser was born in 1901 in Budapest, Hungary. When twenty-six years old, he graduated from the University of Budapest in Mechanical and Electrical Engineering. He graduated in 1926, and was employed by Allgemeine Elektrizitats-Gesellschaft AG in Germany. He relocated to Berlin. In his employment there, he built the two 30-line television receivers that the Hungarian engineer Dénes Mihály demonstrated at the 1928 Berlin Radio Exhibition.

In 1932 he moved from Hungary to England to work on mechanical television, working for Scophony.

He was a pioneer of television in the 1930s, but his work has remained largely unknown because of a "classification" on his National Archives file by the British. He obtained British citizenship shortly after the German invasion of Hungary in World War II, after having failed with a "lukewarm" recommendation from his superiors before the war.

The IET's archivist, Jon Cable, looked into his files, Coincidentally, they had been declassified by the National Archives on 30 December 2014, 31 years early from its 100-year classification.

Wikkenhauser took up a position in Mihály's Telehor Television Company at its start in 1929. He met there GW Walton, a fellow inventor. In the same year, he married a Hungarian woman called Aranka – her maiden name is unknown.

== Early days of television ==
In 1931 Wikkenhauser was invited to take up employment at Scophony, in the United Kingdom, where he would work on the early development of television.

He began as an "assistant technical engineer", but soon climbed up, becoming a Fellow of the Television Society in November 1936.

Scophony was a startup company using the patents of G. W. Walton, who worked with Wikkenhauser's technical ability and character; encouraging him to move to England and further his career.

Scophony Ltd was described as "one of the most ingenious television manufacturers of the 1930s". A significant patent from the international company was the Projection Television System; several were installed and ran successfully. But none were sold: the dark day of World War II on the horizon, even the BBC shut down its television experiments.

Wikkenhauser's systems projected a high definition image upon a screen using mirrors fixed on rapidly rotating drums; the process of their manufacture was hailed as truly innovative.

== Personal life ==
His wife Aranka grew tired of life in Great Britain after six months, and wanted her husband to give up his work and return to Hungary with her. Wikkenhauser, whose primary passion lay in his inventions, was unwilling to resign from his employment and refused.

Aranka returned to Hungary, and their child Ferenc was born in December 1932. Their divorce was finalised in August 1950.

== British naturalisation ==
Wikkenhauser applied for naturalisation to become a British citizen in May 1939, four months before the beginning of the Second World War.

In the naturalisation process, character references were essential. G. W. Walton, now technical advisor and a director of Scophony Ltd, wrote that Wikkenhauser's service had been:

wholly satisfactory, and he has become genuinely attached to this country, and has acquired the same mental outlook or mode of living as people in this country

— G. W. Walton

William H Field, a good friend of Wikkenhauser, found him to be:

Both honest and straightforward in every respect. He should make an excellent British citizen should he be given the opportunity. His sympathies and outlook are British in character and his concern is for the country of his adoption

— William H Field

But the Aliens Department of the Home Office found these backings "lukewarm" and not "cogent"; it was "highly undesirable" to grant the "privilege". Matters of war were a priority.

== War and victory ==
When the BBC stopped TV broadcasts in the Second World War, Socophony could not sell any sets or television equipment to broadcast them, and just stopped altogether.

As with any other companies, it supported the war effort by making quite specific electronic instruments for the Ministry of Aircraft and the Ministry of Supply.

Wikkenhauser was approved for Auxiliary War Work in 1940, in charge of "technical operations".

Phil Judkins, of the University of Buckingham, said:

Scophony's development work for the Air Ministry and the wide-ranging inventiveness of their staff such as Wikkenhauser, are illustrated by the fields in which he worked.

These were: the high-speed cameras in 1939; aircraft direction indicators in 1940, and gyro-driven turn indicators in 1941; high-cycle three phase ground power units in 1942; clinometers and autopilots in 1943, and radar navigation displays in 1944. One particular development was that of linking navigation charts to the radar information to give a single unified display, a technology much later brought to public notice by its use in Concorde

— Phil Judkins

Wikkenhauser then was involved in the radar display information, and made improvements in the dark-trace cathode ray tubes knows as skiatons, some 25,000 of which had been produced in the war for use in fighter control rooms. Judkins says:

He moved on to develop the technology of the transfer to film of radar cathode-ray tube displays, the rapid processing of the film, and its cinema projection.

Scophony may have secured its work with the Air Ministry through the company chairman, Maurice Bonham-Carter, who was also a director of Frank Whittle's firm, Power Jets.

Bonham-Carter wrote to Fank Edward Smith, Director of Instrumental Production at the Ministry of Supply, in August 1940, on the matter of Wikkenhauser's naturalisation:

In charge of the technical work is Mr G Wikkenhauser, now Chief Engineer of the Company.

The Home Office is not granting in wartime the privilege of naturalisation unless a Government Department makes a recommendation in favour of the person concerned.

But Scophony was now engaged exclusively in Government work, and Bonham-Carter felt it would have been a great advantage to the company and Government departments if Wikkenhauser had the status of a British subject, particularly so as in some cases

special dispensation had to be granted by such Government Departments in order to permit Wikkenhauser to supervise orders of a secret nature.

Bonham-Carter said that Wikkenhauser had no relations and no connections in Germany, and since 1932 had never left Britain (except for brief holidays). By that time, Hungary had joined the Axis powers against the Allied forces. According to international law, Wikkenhauser was liable to civilian internment and could be declared an enemy alien, risking deportation from Britain or a time at an internment camp. It was important to prove that he wasn't anti-British.

Finding Wikkenhauser to be an asset to Scophony's wartime projects, Sir Frank wrote directly to the Home Office in August 1940, stating Wikkenhauser was "a man of great technical ability whose services to the country should be retained, unless there is some serious objection to him as an alien: I have no reason to doubt the good faith of any members of the Company, including Mr Wikkenhauser."

Because of this letter, in 1941 Wikkenhauser was granted his naturalisation as a British subject and was free to carry out his work without complication of his heritage.

== Later life ==
In the later years of his career, Wikkenhauser's efforts in science and engineering were acknowledged. He was awarded an MBE in June 1946 for his work in technology and science, and married his second wife Pamela that same year.

In 1947, he left Scophony to work for Kelvin Hughes and became internationally recognised for his investigations in nautical scientific instruments, bringing his knowledge to help with marine radar and echo sounding.

The most complex and perhaps best-known of his varied work was photographic projection display systems for fighter control, used in the post-war revision and upgrading of the UK's early-warning system, the Rotor project. With Albert E Adams, Wikkenhauser's patent for film projection with continuously moving film, filed in 1947 and patented in January 1960, was significant in the Rotor's development. Judkins adds: "The Rotor project involved processing and drying the film involved, and some ten seconds, in order to give real-time controllers."

In March 1956, Wikkenhauser was elected Member of the British Institution of Radio City of London in 1958. The following year he was also voted into the Fellowship of the Institute of Navigation at the Royal Geographical Society, for his contribution so the science of navigation.

Wikkenhauser retired in 1967. His last application for a patent is recorded on 11 December 1967. He died in 1974, aged 73, while living in Essex.
