= Scophony =

Mechanical television system

Scophony was a sophisticated mechanical television system developed in Britain by Scophony Limited. A black and white image was produced by an early form of acousto-optic modulation of a bright light using a piezoelectric crystal to excite vibrations in a column of water or another transparent liquid.

== Principle of operation ==
The light modulator worked as follows. Crystal vibrations at one end of a horizontal water column would cause waves to propagate through the water. The light was passed through this column from the side across the waves as they propagated through the column, via separate horizontal and vertical orientated cylindrical lenses. The vibrations through the water would act as a diffraction grating, the higher the amplitude, the more that the light passing through would be diffracted. The light passed through the water column was then horizontally focussed onto either a slit or narrow optical block, depending on whether positive or negative modulation of the water column was used. The amount of light which would either pass through the slit or go around the block depended on the amplitude of the modulation, thereby causing the light amplitude to be modulated. Following the slit/block, the light would hit the high speed horizontal rotating mirror drum which was synchronised to the propagation of the waves through the water bath, in order that a particular wave in the water bath would appear at a fixed position on the screen, although that wave would actually be moving through the water column. This technique allowed significantly more of the light from the light source to be used compared to previous light modulation techniques. Vertical scanning was achieved by a separate much larger rotating mirror drum.

It is a common misconception that the water column would contain a complete video line, but this was not necessary with the Scophony system.

== Innovation ==
Scophony's system used several innovative devices:

- A split horizontal and vertical focus optical system invented by Walton, developed specially for use with mirror scanning systems and the Jeffree cell. Light beams were focused by crossed cylindrical lenses, concentrating the light in two planes. This allowed the use of smaller lenses and mirrors, thus reducing size and cost. This was particularly important to Scophony since they intended to produce extremely large images.
- A light modulator developed by J.H. Jeffree in 1934 and known as the Jeffree cell, a cell filled with a transparent fluid which used mechanical oscillations to modulate the light beam passing through it. It was a substantial improvement over the previous Kerr cell, 200 times as much modulated light being available at the screen.
- High speed synchronous motors which could be relied on for 1000 hours of use, some lasting longer without noticeable wear. The Scophony system used two: a low speed scanner which operated at 240 RPM and a high speed scanner which ran at 30,375 RPM for 405 line transmissions or 39,690 RPM for the American 441 line system.

== Company ==
The company Scophony Limited was established by entrepreneur Solomon Sagall in the early 1930s to exploit the patents of inventor George William Walton and William Stephenson. In 1932, Ferranti invested £3,500 in the company, however in 1934 Ferranti turned down the option to invest a further £10,000 to re-structure Scophony Limited, and in 1935 EKCO replaced Ferranti as the company's main investor.

In 1938, the Scophony company demonstrated three types of 405 line mechanical television receivers at the Radiolympia exhibition in London: a home receiver, with a picture area of approximately 24 in × 20 in (61 cm × 51 cm) and two systems intended for theater operation, one producing a 6 ft × 5 ft (180 cm × 150 cm) image and the other a 9 ft × 12 ft (270 cm × 370 cm) image.

Several of the theatre systems were installed and operated successfully but none of the receivers were sold as production was halted due to the impending war.

Scophony Limited operated as a television manufacturer in Britain up to WWII and then in the USA. During WWII Scophony moved to Somerset and worked on war work. "Of all the electro-mechanical television techniques invented and developed by the mid-1930s, the technology known as Scophony had no rival in terms of technical performance."

In November 1948, Scophony merged with John Logie Baird Ltd to become Scophony-Baird; offering for sale a line of four Baird-branded television sets the following year.

== See also ==
- Ulises Armand Sanabria
- Joshua Sieger
- Gustav Wikkenhauser
