= Peck Television Corp. =

Peck Television Corp. was a private company headquartered in Montreal, Canada that was a pioneer in television. William Hoyt Peck developed a mechanical television system that was soon superseded by electronic television. Peck Television developed cameras, receivers and was engaged in broadcasting over Montreal's VE9EC (also given as VE9AK and known as Channel 6) in the period of 1931 to 1935 and again in a period starting in 1952.

In 1935, Peck denigrated the still developing medium of electronic television, touting the virtues of mechanical television. He was quoted in the January 1935 edition of Radio News and Short Wave Radio as saying, "Television is already here. It meets all the requirements laid down by critics, at least as far as my system is concerned, which will provide images up to two by three feet, with detail comparable to that of home movie pictures, and bright enough to be clearly visible in a room containing two or three floor lamps."

He went on to say, "Mechanical scanning will, in my opinion, be the most popular system. It affords a more sharply defined picture element than does the cathode ray tube, replacement of light source is necessary at longer intervals and costs but 10 cents instead of many dollars."

In December 1935, Hoyt began a five-week period of trial broadcasts using his mechanical system in Montreal.
