= Ulises Armand Sanabria =

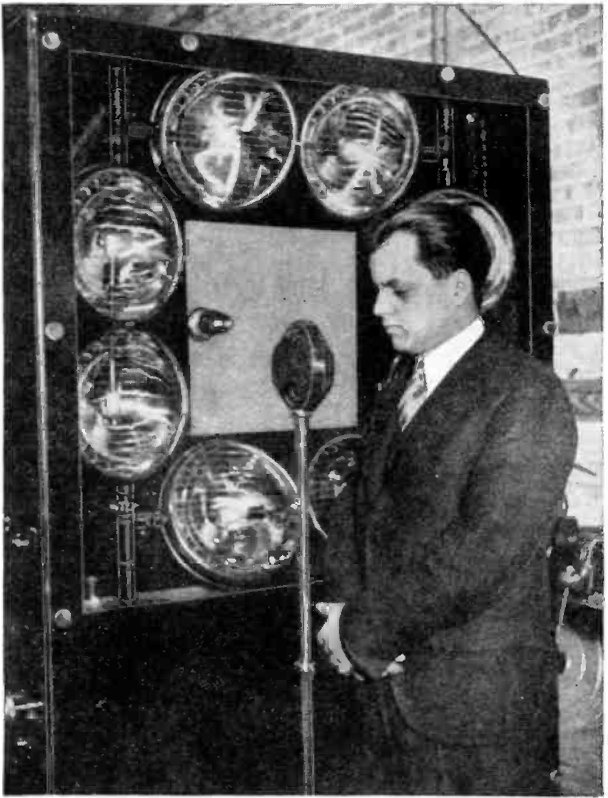
- Sanabria in front of a flying spot scanner he developed
- Born: 5 September 1906; Oak Park, Illinois
- Died: 6 January 1969 (aged 62)
- Children: Robert K., Ulises Armand Jr., Penolopy, Patricia and Quentin
- Engineering career
- Projects: Inventing mechanical television, founding WCFL
- Significant design: mechanical television
- Significant advance: mechanical television

Ulises Armand Sanabria (September 5, 1906 – January 6, 1969) was born in southern Chicago of Puerto Rican and French-American parents. Sanabria is known for development of mechanical televisions and early terrestrial television broadcasts.

== Career ==
Sanabria was the builder and engineer of WCFL, the first mechanical television station which went on the air in Chicago on June 12, 1928. By sending the sound signal to station WIBO and the video signal on WCFL, he was the first to transmit sound and picture simultaneously on the same wave band on May 19, 1929.

At age 15 Sanabria told his girlfriend that he was going to invent television. Two years later, he figured out how to do it. Two more years later, at the age of 19, he demonstrated the first television in Chicago. This was only months after the first demonstrations of mechanical television by Charles Francis Jenkins in the US and John Logie Baird in the UK.

By 1929, Sanabria was operating his own station, WX9AO, with the help of radio station WIBO. In that year, he asked a young comedian named Milton Berle to appear on one of his station's programs.

The "grand opening" of television station W9XAP took place in the evening of August 27, 1930. A number of receivers had been distributed to homes and stores in the Chicago area. Sears, Roebuck had advertised extensively and crowds had assembled to see and hear. Bill Hay was the announcer and several other WMAQ artists performed. The signal was strong and the program good, but ghost images were terrific and the results disappointing. Apparently the good steady signal from W9XAP made the ghost images distinct and objectionable, whereas the self-excited oscillator of W9XAO seemed to make them less distinct and quite tolerable.

By 1934, Sanabria was able to present a projecting television system with a picture 30 feet wide. He continued to demonstrate his system until the late 1930s and was in business manufacturing television picture tubes until 1955.

Also, in 1940 Sanabria working with Dr. Lee de Forest explored the concept of a primitive unmanned combat aerial vehicle using a television camera and a jam-resistant radio control and presented their idea in a Popular Mechanics issue.

In the years before World War II, Sanabria formed and was the principal stockholder and president of American Television Corp., and set up and operated a very popular four year national correspondence school and a four-year residence school in Chicago, Detroit and Los Angeles. De Forest was a consultant to Sanabria and the school. They were in the process of setting up another branch in New York on Pearl Harbor Day. During the war years, 2,000 of their students were recruited by the U.S. armed forces. The school, "American Television Institute of Technology", had 6,000 men in four-year training courses, in which they were granted the first Bachelor of Science Degrees in Television Engineering.

== Personal life ==
Sanabria married his high school sweetheart and had two sons from his first marriage; Robert K., and Ulises Armand Sanabria II. He also fathered three children from his second marriage; two daughters, Penolopy and Patricia, and one son, Quentin.

== See also ==
- History of television
- Mechanical television
