= Jeffree cell =

The Jeffree cell was an early acousto-optic modulator, best known for its use in the Scophony system of mechanical television. It was invented by J.H. Jeffree in 1934, and was a major improvement over the Kerr cell modulators used up to that time by allowing more than 200 times the available modulated light.

Using ultrasonic sound waves travelling perpendicular to the light, the modulator created areas of varying refractive index leading to advancement and retardation of portions of the light wavefront. This led to constructive and destructive interference among the light waves, modulating their intensity.
