= FOSDIC =

Optical scanners

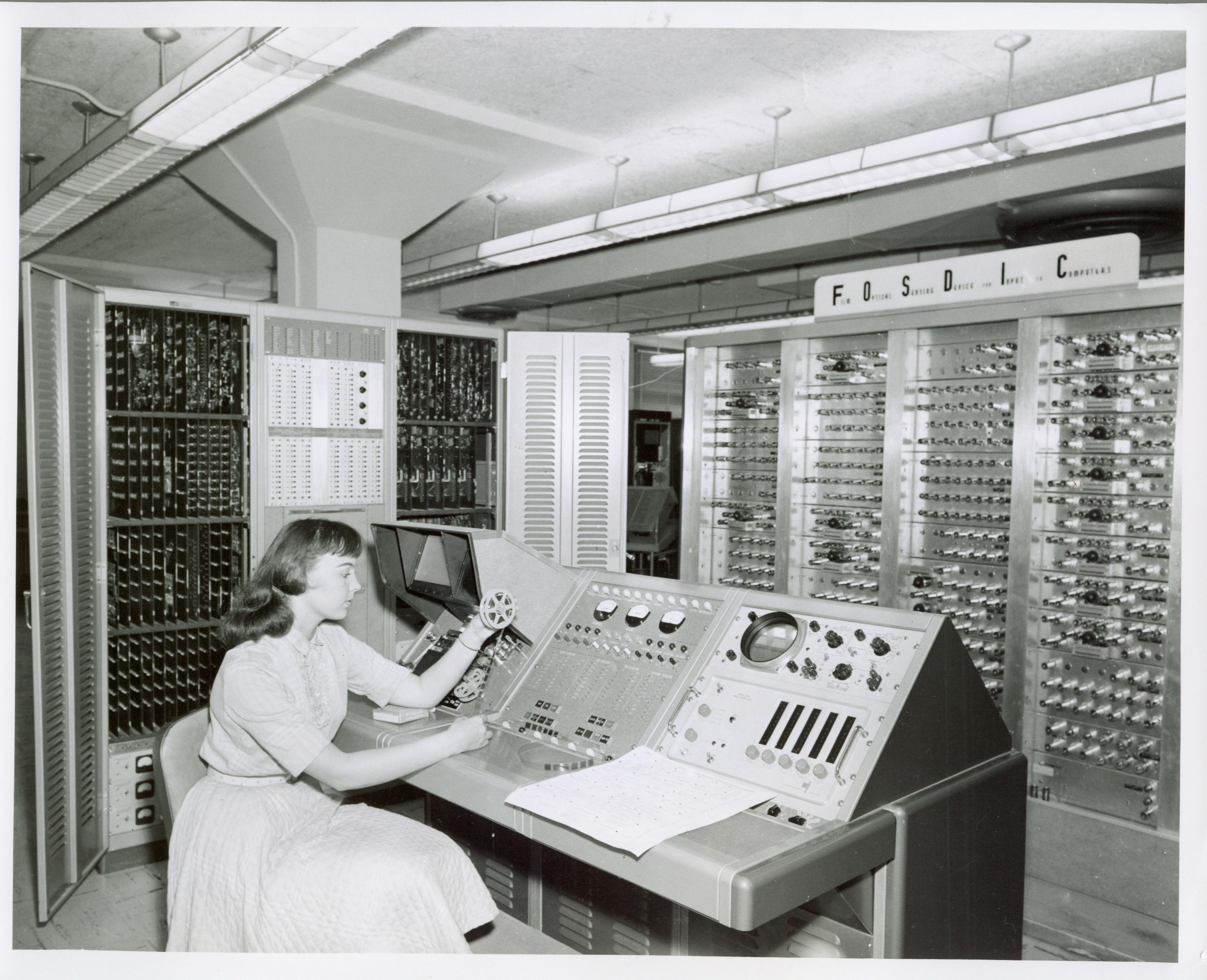
Technician inspecting film at FOSDIC console. A paper input form is on the desk.

FOSDIC (Film Optical Sensing Device for Input to Computers) is a family of optical scanners for converting data on microfilm to computer-readable magnetic tape. FOSDIC was designed and built by the United States National Bureau of Standards for use by the United States Census Bureau and other government agencies.

Although the Census Bureau entered the computer age with the introduction of UNIVAC I in 1951, its data processing speed was hampered by the continued reliance upon punched cards. Transferring questionnaire data to punch cards that UNIVAC "read" and stored on magnetic tape was a time-consuming process that remained relatively unchanged since the late nineteenth century.

To take advantage of UNIVAC's speed, National Bureau of Standards scientists and Census Bureau engineers began development of FOSDIC. Completed in 1954, the first generation of FOSDIC read the position of pencil-filled circles on questionnaires and translated the responses to computer code stored on magnetic computer tape.

The Census Bureau first used FOSDIC to process a decennial census in 1960. Enumerators transferred data collected on questionnaires to a "FOSDIC-readable schedule" on which questionnaire responses were recorded as pencilled-in circles. At the Census Bureau, technicians used extremely sensitive photography equipment to convert these forms into microfilm. In 1970 and later censuses, all questionnaires were FOSDIC readable, eliminating the need to have enumerators transfer data from questionnaires to FOSDIC schedules.

The shaded circles appeared as light dots on the microfilm. When the microfilm passed through the Census Bureau's new fleet of FOSDIC III machines (FOSDIC II had been designed for the Weather Bureau), they read the placement of the bright marks on the microfilm and translated them into computer code.

The Census Bureau used updated versions of FOSDIC for the 1970, 1980, and 1990 censuses. FOSDIC proved so successful that it was not replaced until the introduction of optical character recognition for the 2000 Census.

== Technology ==
A series of systems were developed for use in the 1960, 1970, 1980 and 1990 U.S. census. The first system, delivered in 1954 used vacuum tubes and analog processing. Later versions used software control with a PDP-11 minicomputer. FOSDIC used a flying-spot scanner to detect marks on forms that had previously been photographed on microfilm. Other applications included digitizing unemployment data, EPA Pollutant charts, NOAA Underwater current meter records and . The U.S. Postal Research Laboratory used a surplus FOSDIC system to make high-resolution images of dead-letter mail to create a data base for evaluating character-recognition techniques

The FOSDIC system was also use by the National Archives to digitize the images of Army enlistment records on punched card that were stored on 1,586 rolls of microfilm.

== Sources ==
This article incorporates text from a free content work. Licensed under Public Domain as a work of the U.S. Government. Text taken from , U.S. Census Bureau.
