= Frank Gray (researcher) =

American physicist, researcher, and inventor

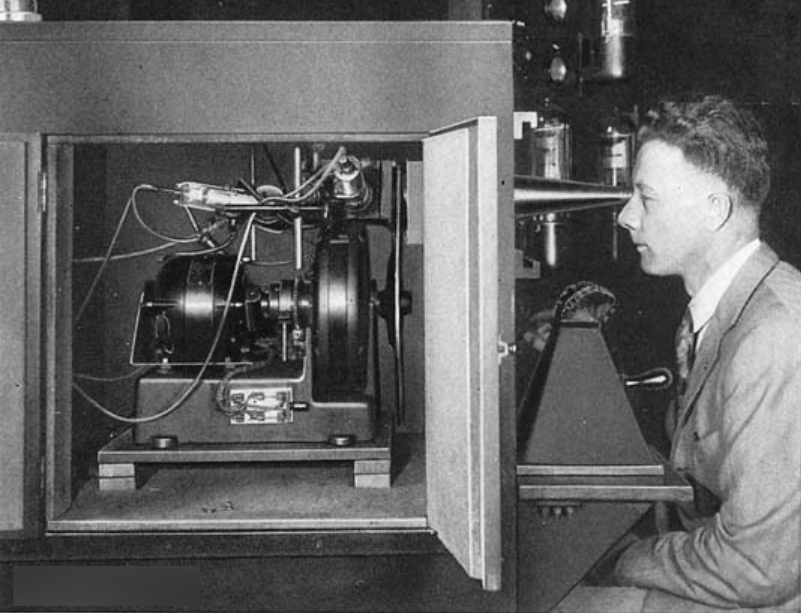
Frank Gray peering into a mechanical television apparatus in 1930

Frank Gray (13 September 1887 – 23 May 1969) was a physicist and researcher at Bell Labs who made numerous innovations in television, both mechanical and electronic, and is remembered for the Gray code.

The Gray code, or reflected binary code (RBC), appearing in Gray's 1953 patent, is a binary numeral system often used in electronics, but with many applications in mathematics.

Gray conducted pioneering research on the development of television; he proposed an early form of "flying spot scanner" for early TV systems in 1927, and helped develop a two-way mechanically scanned TV system in 1930.

With Pierre Mertz, Gray wrote the classic paper on the mathematics of raster scan systems in 1934. He later participated in the early days of the digital revolution, with Raymond W. Sears, William M. Goodall, John Robinson Pierce, and others at Bell Labs, by providing the binary code used by Sears in his PCM tube, a beam deflection tube of the type that Sears and Pierce collaborated on, which was used in Goodall's "Television by pulse code modulation".

== Early life ==
Gray graduated from Purdue University in 1911 with a degree in physics.

== Patents ==
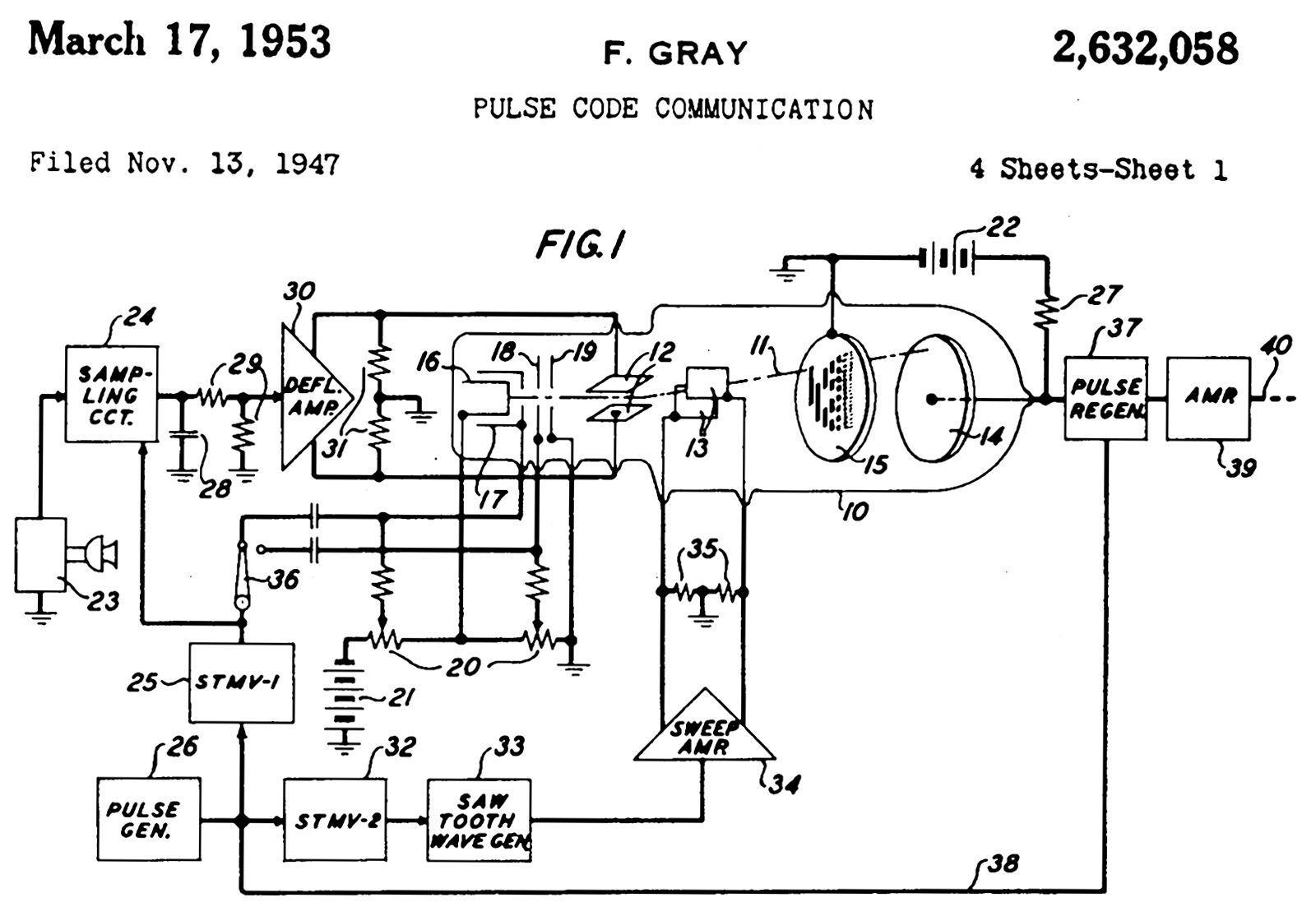
Part of front page of Gray's 1953 "Gray code" patent, 2,632,058, showing PCM tube (10) with reflected binary code in plate (15)

With Herbert E. Ives as co-inventor, Gray filed for two US patents in 1927: "Electro-optical system" (US 2,037,471, issued 14 April 1936) and "Electro-optical transmission" (US 1,759,504, issued 20 May 1930), and one in just his own name: "Television system" (US 2,113,254, issued 5 April 1938). He patented many other similar-sounding inventions over the years that followed.

His 1953 patent "Pulse Code Communication" with the Gray code was filed in 1947.
