= Vitascan =

Television camera system

Vitascan (sometimes alternately spelled VitaScan) was an early color television camera system developed by American television equipment manufacturer DuMont Laboratories. Development began in 1949 and the product was released on an experimental basis in 1956. Vitascan was fully compatible with the NTSC color system, and DuMont Labs hoped the system would catch on in the television industry.

However, Vitascan cameras only worked indoors, due to Vitascan being in essence a flying-spot scanner based system. The system's camera basically worked in reverse by projecting a light through the camera's lens onto the subject from a cathode ray tube, or CRT, mounted behind the lens (instead of a pickup tube like conventional television cameras), providing the "flying spot". Four photomultiplier tubes (two for red, one for green, and one for blue) mounted inside special "scoops" placed in the studio and pointed at the subject would pick up the light from the camera's CRT and produce the final image to be televised.

Normally, with any flying-spot scanned system, the area between the flying-spot CRT and photomultiplier tubes (the whole studio in Vitascan's case) would have to be completely darkened, in order to prevent any other light, besides the light for the flying spot from the CRT, from interfering with the photomultiplier tubes. Darkening the whole room would make things quite inconvenient for any talent present in a Vitascan studio, but to get around this, strobe lighting was used in the studio for the aid of the talent. The strobe light, referred to as a "sync-lite" by DuMont, would light up only when the photomultiplier scoops were in the vertical blanking intervals of the video they would generate, to prevent any light interference to the photomultiplier tubes. Due to this, the system could not be used outdoors because sunlight would interfere during the scanning phase.

From 1956 to 1959, Vitascan cameras were in use at independent television station WITI in Milwaukee, Wisconsin, for its local TV news programs. However, the limitations of the cameras caused WITI to eventually return to monochrome cameras. The television industry never adopted Vitascan, and television stations continued to operate mostly in black-and-white for many more years. Vitascan, like earlier DuMont technologies such as the Electronicam, failed to catch on.
