= Flying-spot scanner =

Type of image scanner

The parts of a flying spot scanner: (A) cathode-ray tube (CRT); (B) photon beam; (C) & (D) dichroic mirrors; (E), (F) & (G) red-, green- and blue-sensitive photomultipliers.

A flying-spot scanner (FSS) uses a scanning source of a spot of light, such as a high-resolution, high-light-output, low-persistence cathode ray tube (CRT), to scan an image. Usually the image to be scanned is on photographic film, such as motion picture film, or a slide or photographic plate. The output of the scanner is usually a television signal.

== Basic principle ==
In the case of the CRT-based scanner, as an electron beam is drawn across the face of the CRT it creates a scan that has the correct number of lines and aspect ratio for the format of the signal. The image of this scan is focused with a lens onto the film frame. Its light passes through the image being scanned and is converted to a proportional electrical signal by photomultiplier tube(s), one for each color (red, green, blue), that detects the variations in intensity of the beam spot as it scans across the film, and are converted to proportional electrical signals, one for each of the color channels.

Telecines that use a monochrome CRT as the light source can be referred to as flying-spot scanners. The advantage of the FSS technique is that as colour analysis is done after scanning; simple dichroics may be used to split the light to each photomultiplier —and there are no registration errors, as would have been introduced by early electronic cameras.

== Early use ==
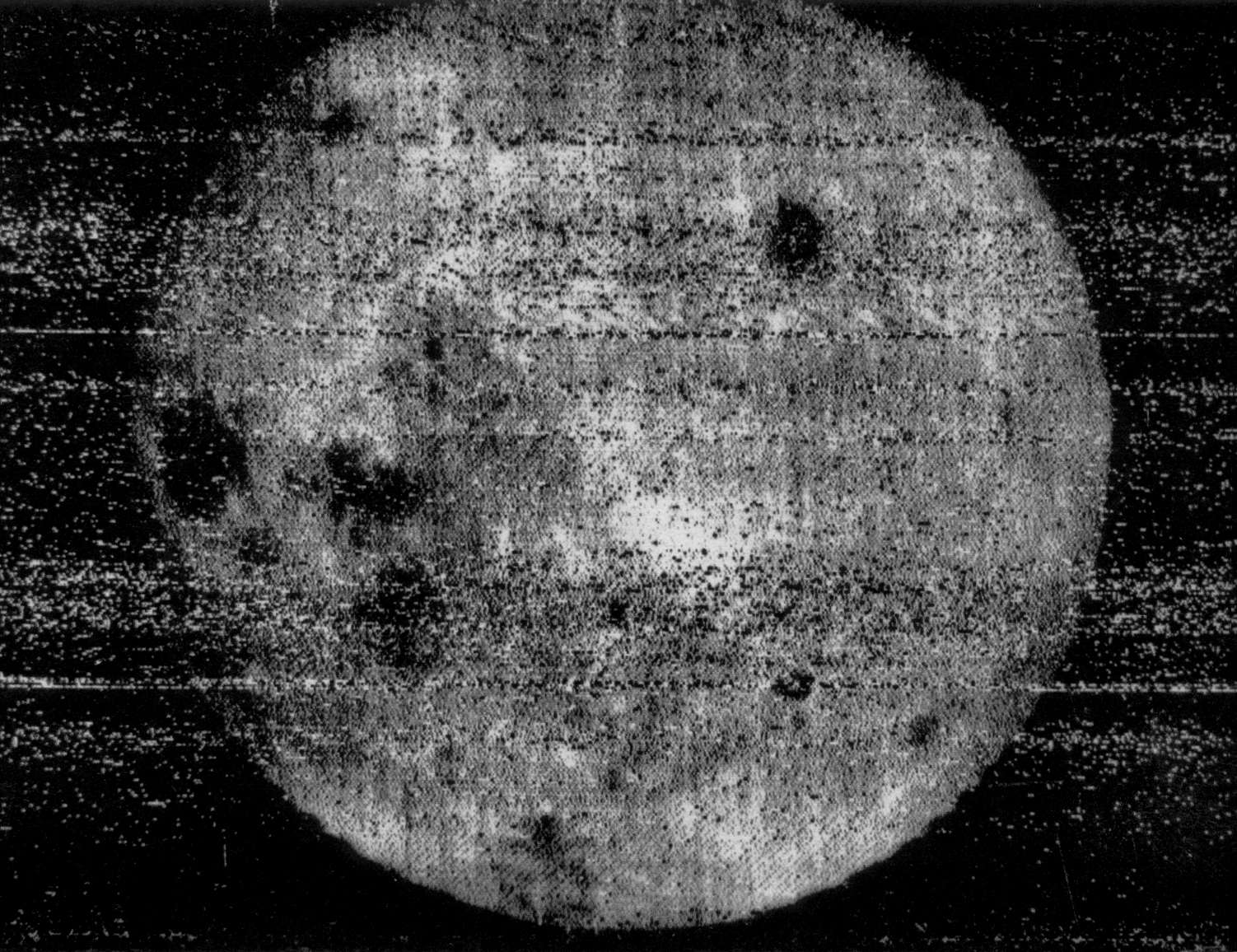
The first image of the far side of the Moon, transmitted back to Earth using a flying-spot scanner by Luna 3 in 1959

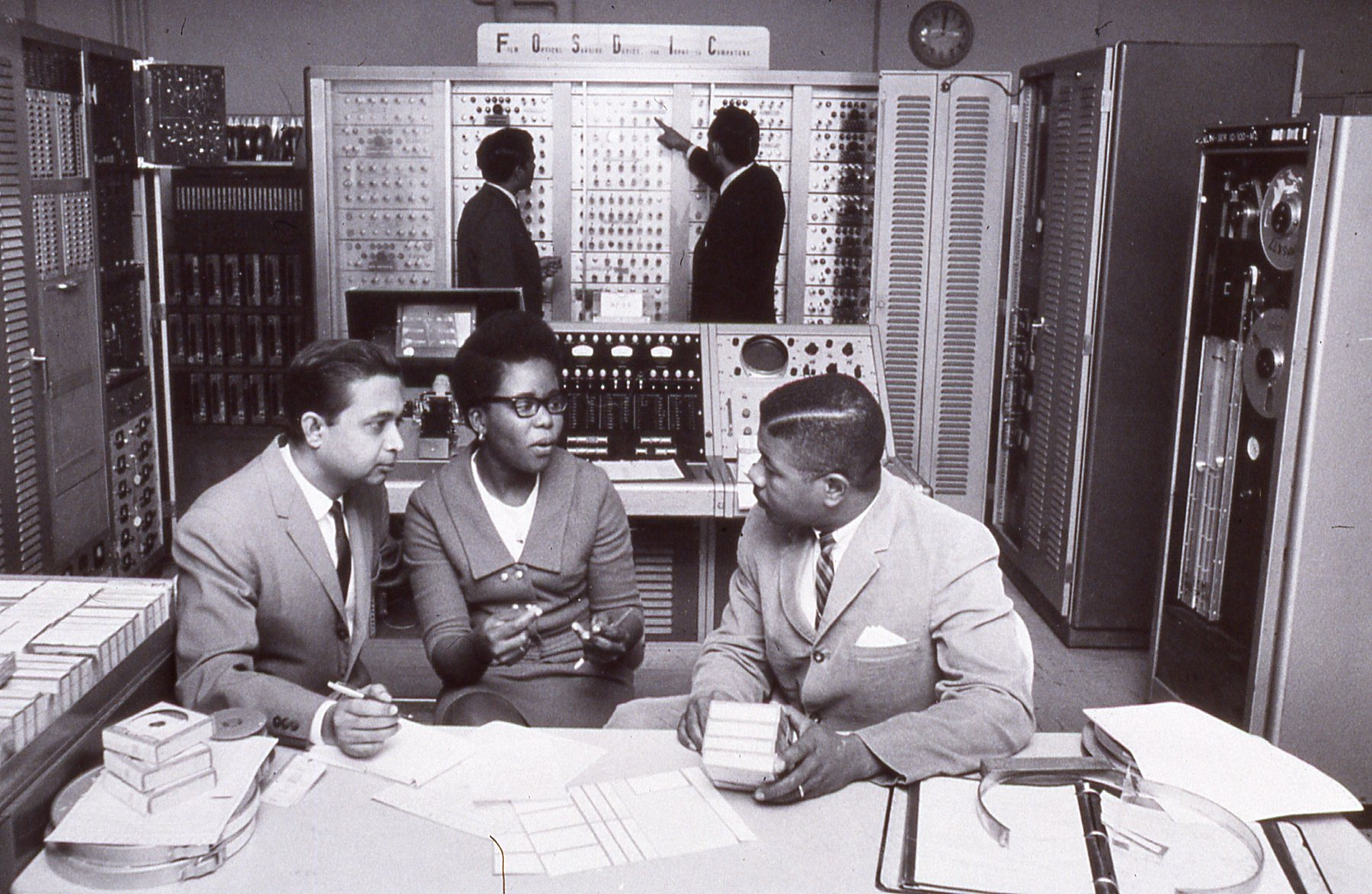
The U.S. Census Bureau used a flying spot scanner called FOSDIC to digitize census forms stored on microfilm in the 1960s.

Historically, flying-spot scanners were also used as primitive live-action studio cameras at the dawn of electronic television, in the 1920s. A projector equipped with a spinning perforated Nipkow disc created the spot that scanned the stage. Scanning a subject this way required a completely dark stage, and was impractical for production use, but gave early researchers a way to generate live images before practical imaging pickup tubes were perfected.

== DuMont Vitascan ==
Flying-spot scanner technology was later implemented by DuMont Laboratories in the Vitascan color television system, released in 1956. Vitascan produced NTSC color video using a camera that acted in reverse by housing the flying-spot CRT which was projected through the camera's lens and illuminated the subject in a special light-tight studio. The light from the CRT camera was then picked up by special "scoops" housing 4 photomultiplier tubes (2 for red, 1 for green, and 1 for blue), which then would provide video of the talent in the studio. Unlike earlier FSS systems that relied on the studio being entirely darkened, Vitascan used a special strobe light would illuminate the studio for the talent's convenience, and would turn on during the photomultiplier scoop's blanking interval pulses, so as not to interfere with the scanning.

== Broadcast use ==
Flying-spot scanners were used to scan both still print slides and motion picture film for both broadcast TV and later post-production use. Flying-spot slide scanners were used for Station identification picture and to turn Test film into test TV pictures. There would be a slide changer like on slide projectors to change the slide. Flying-spot motion picture film scanners were used since the early days of TV, since film cameras had better quality than early TV cameras. Early manufactures of Flying-spot scanners were Bosch Fernseh and Cintel. Cintel made Flying-spot scanners from the 1950s until the 2000s. The flying-spot scanner tube had a limited life span and suffered degradation in quality with each use. Most flying-spot scanners use a green light that is shone through the exposed film image into a lens. White light gives a better picture. Flying-spot scanners were replaced with charge-coupled device Line Array – CCD for imaging and a white light to the film.

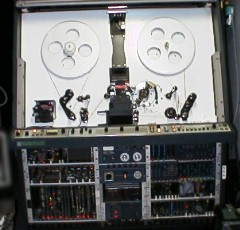
Flying-spot scanner by Rank Cintel the Mark 3, 1975

== See also ==
- Frank Gray (researcher)
- History of television
- Electronic Video Recording
- FOSDIC, a flying spot scanner used to digitize U.S. Census forms
- Cintel maker of film flying-spot scanners
- Spirit DataCine CCD Scanner

== Photo gallery ==
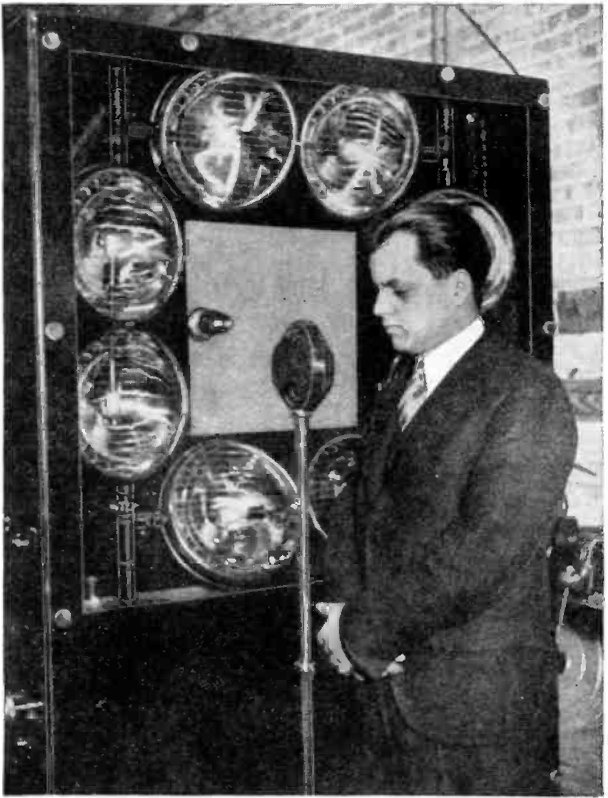
Mechanical Flying spot scanner 1931

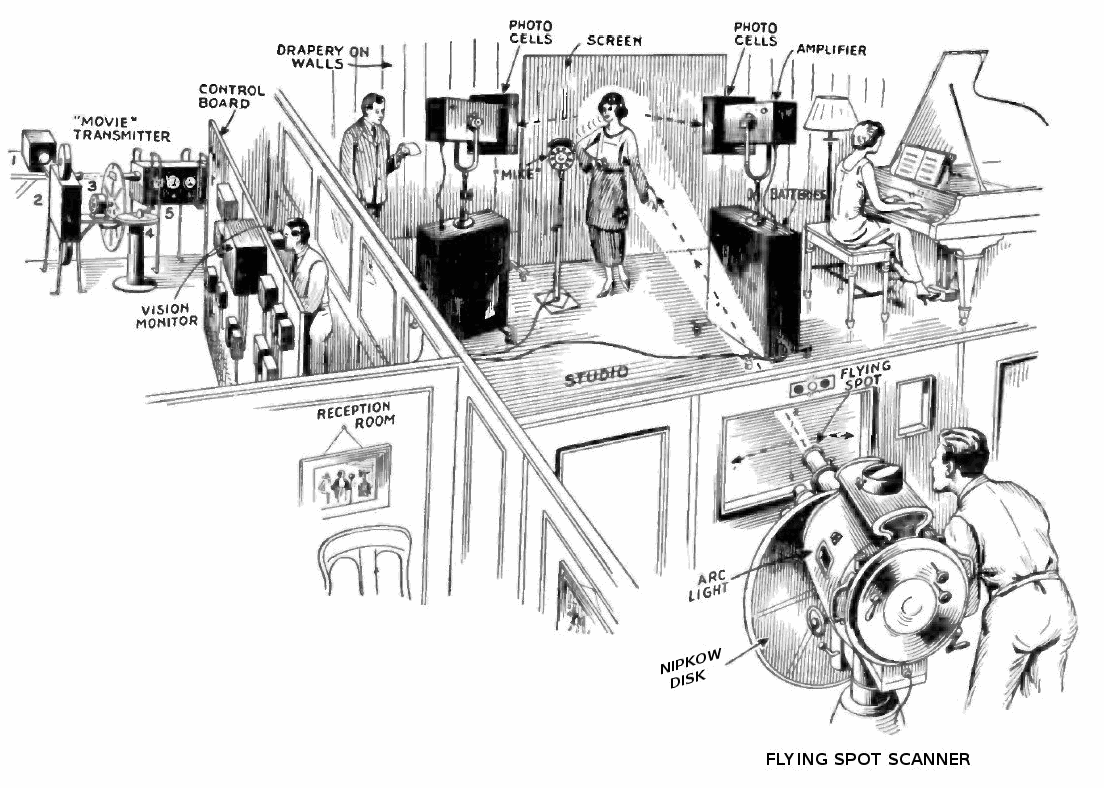
Mechanical Flying spot scanner television studio 1931

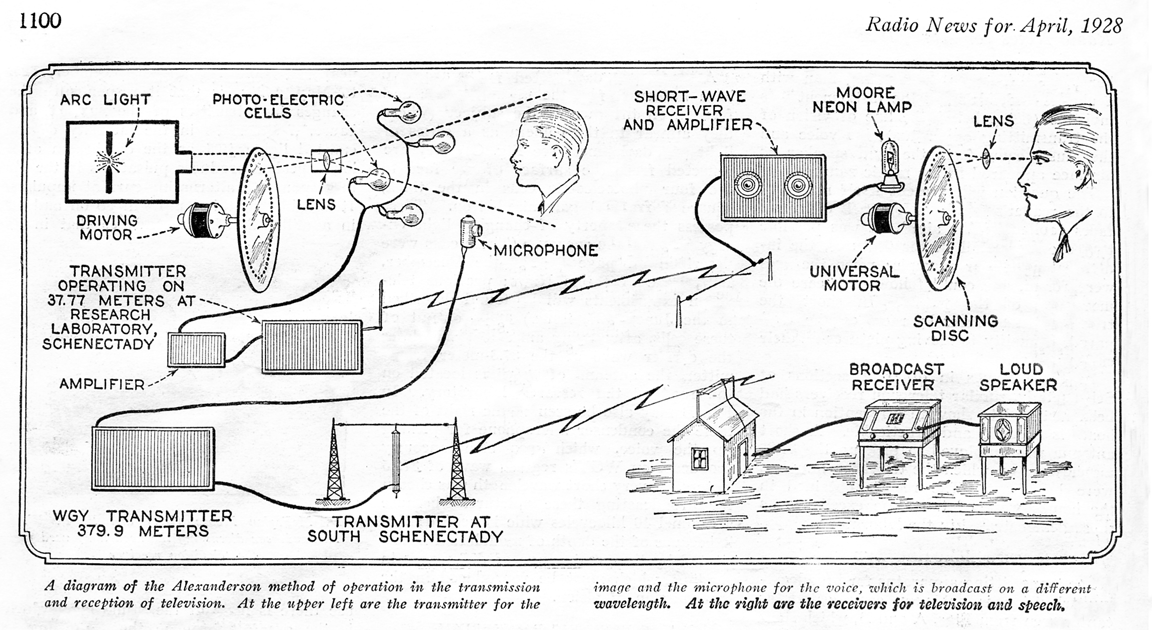
Early Television System Diagram

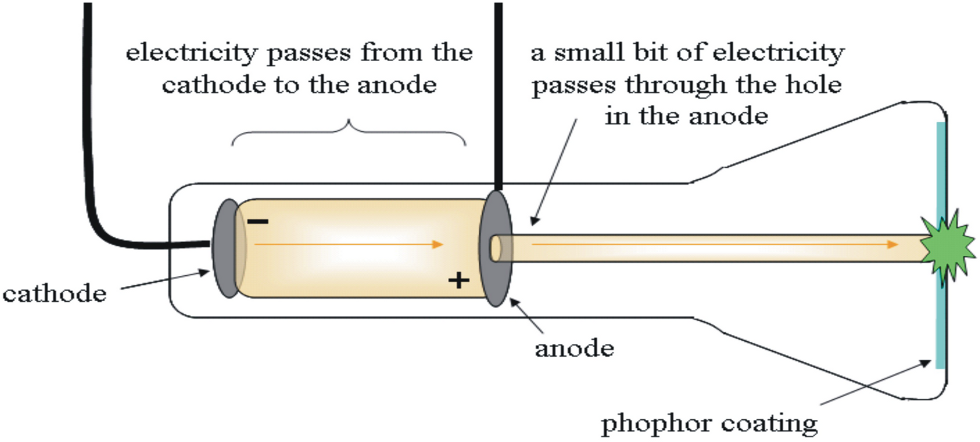
Cathode ray Tube

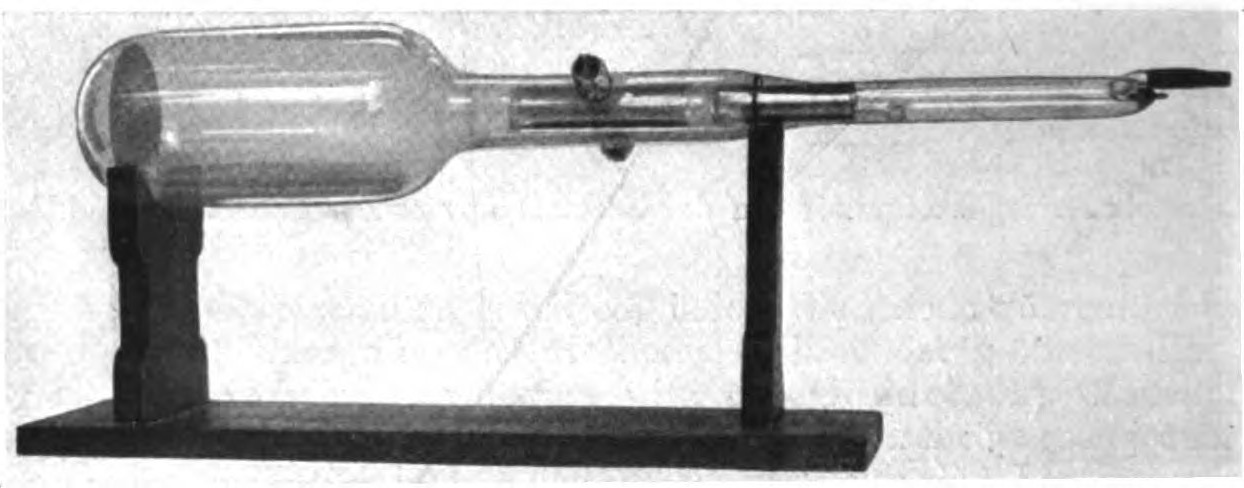
Braun Cathode ray Tube from 1921

Photo Multiplier Tube And Scintillator

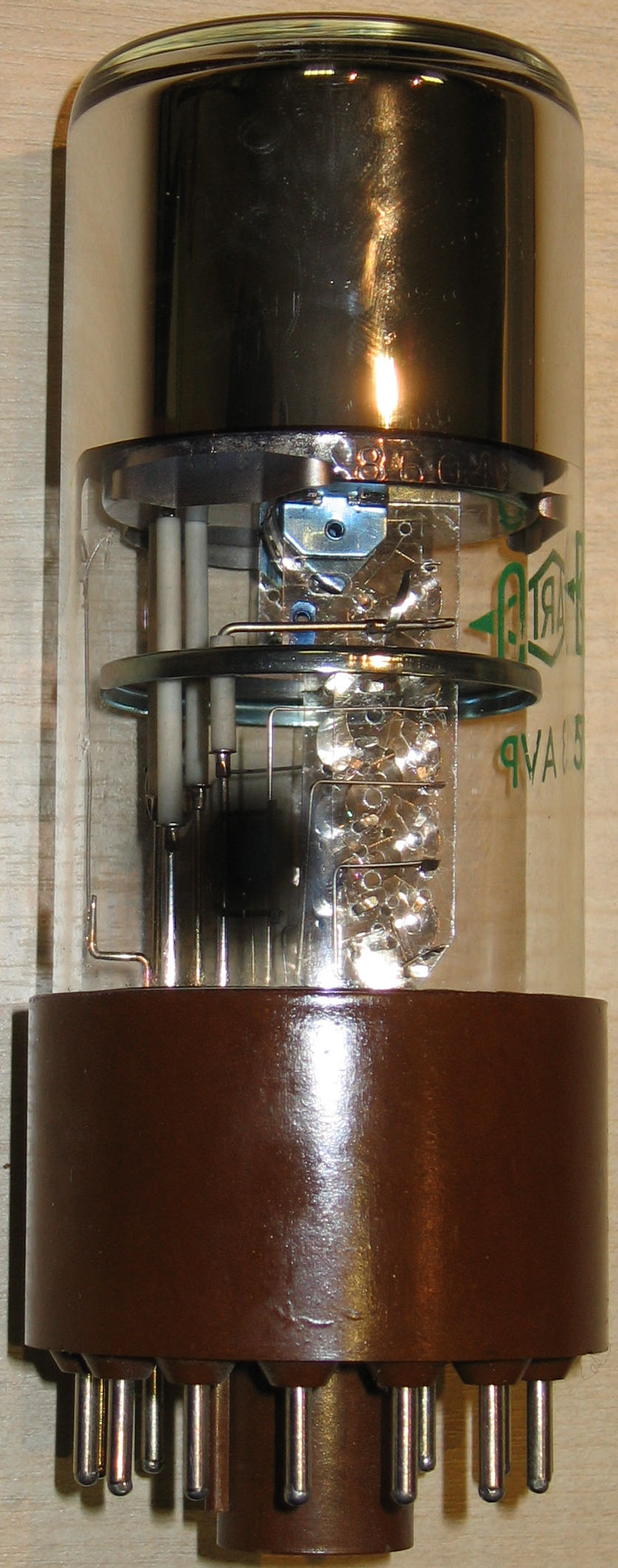
Photo Multiplier Tube

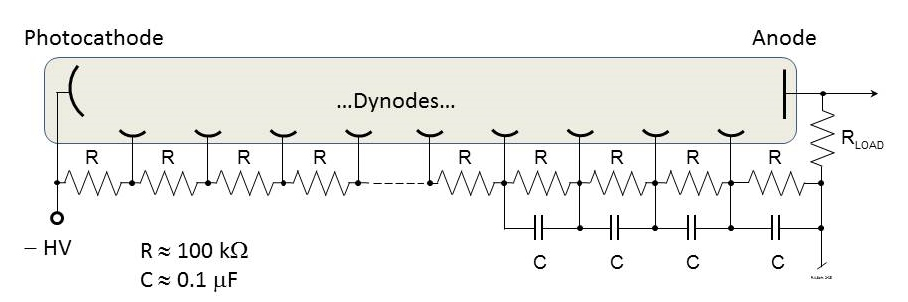
Photo Multiplier Tube
