= Paul Gottlieb Nipkow =

German electrical engineer and inventor (1860–1940)

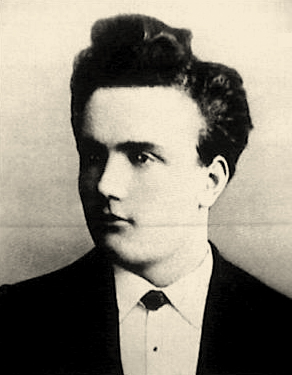
- Nipkow, c. 1884
- Born: Paul Julius Gottlieb Nipkow; 22 August 1860; Lauenburg, Province of Pomerania, Kingdom of Prussia, German Confederation
- Died: 24 August 1940 (aged 80); Berlin, Nazi Germany
- Occupations: Engineer; inventor
- Known for: Nipkow disk
- Engineering career
- Discipline: Electrical engineering
- Significant advance: Television

Paul Julius Gottlieb Nipkow (German: [ˈpaʊl ˈgɔtliːp ˈnɪpkoː]; 22 August 1860 – 24 August 1940) was a German electrical engineer and inventor. He invented the Nipkow disk, which laid the foundation of television, since his disk was a fundamental component in the first televisions. Hundreds of stations experimented with television broadcasting using his disk in the 1920s and 1930s, until it was superseded by all-electronic systems in the 1940s.

Nipkow has been called the "father of television", together with other early figures of television history like Karl Ferdinand Braun.

The first regular television service in the world, Fernsehsender Paul Nipkow, was named in his honour.

== Beginnings ==
Nipkow was born in Lauenburg (now Lębork) in the Prussian province of Pomerania, now part of Poland. While at school in neighbouring Neustadt (now Wejherowo), in the province of West Prussia, Nipkow experimented in telephony and the transmission of moving pictures. After graduation, he went to Berlin in order to study science. He studied physiological optics with Hermann von Helmholtz, and electro-physics with Adolf Slaby.

== Nipkow disk ==
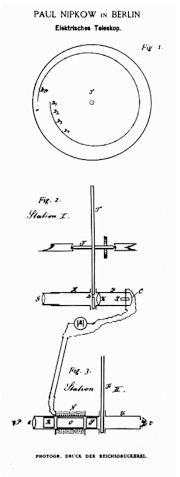
Nipkow's 'disc' from the patent application of 1884

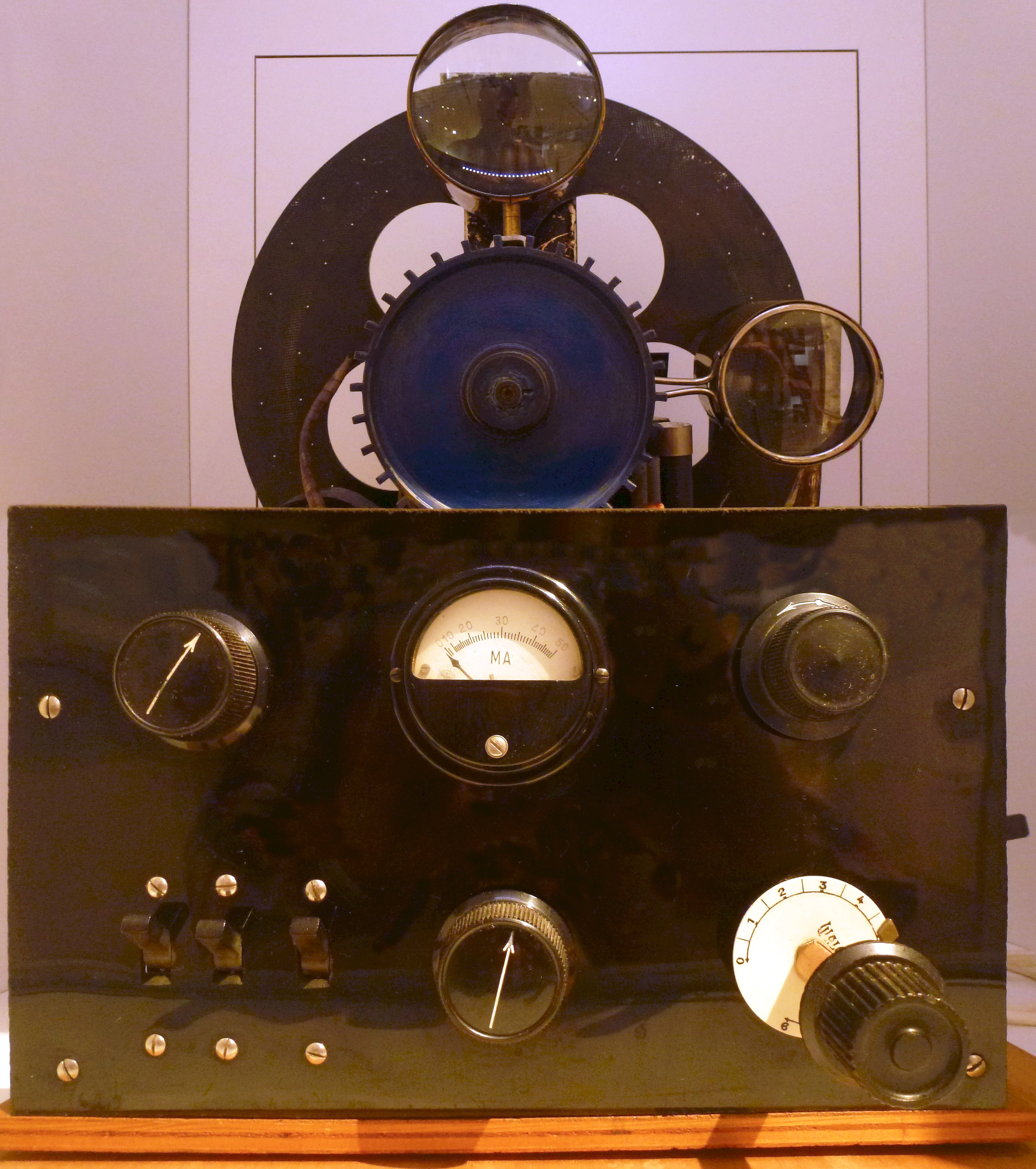
A television receiver using a Nipkow disk in the Tekniska museet, Stockholm

While still a student he conceived an "electric telescope", mainly known for the idea of using a spiral-perforated disk (Nipkow disk), to divide a picture into a linear sequence of points. Accounts of its invention state that the idea came to him while sitting alone at home with an oil lamp on Christmas Eve, 1883. Alexander Bain had transmitted images telegraphically in the 1840s but the Nipkow disk improved the encoding process.

He applied to the imperial patent office in Berlin for a patent covering an "electric telescope" for the "electric reproduction of illuminating objects", in the category "electric apparatuses". This was granted on 15 January 1885, retroactive to 6 January 1884. It is not known whether Nipkow ever attempted a practical realization of this disk, but one may assume that he himself never constructed one. The patent lapsed after 15 years owing to lack of interest. Nipkow took up a position as a construction engineer at an railway signal factory in Berlin-Borsigwalde and did not continue work on the broadcasting of pictures.

== First TV systems ==
The first television broadcasts used an optical-mechanical picture scanning method, the method that Nipkow had helped create with his disk; he could claim credit for the invention. Nipkow recounted his first sight of television at a Berlin radio show in 1928: "The televisions stood in dark cells. Hundreds stood and waited patiently for the moment at which they would see television for the first time. I waited among them, growing ever more nervous. Now for the first time, I would see what I had devised 45 years ago. Finally, I reached the front row; a dark cloth was pushed to the side, and I saw before me a flickering image, not easy to discern." The system demonstrated was from the company Telefunken.

From the early 1930s, total electronic picture scanning, based on the work of Manfred von Ardenne, became increasingly prevalent, and Nipkow's invention was no longer essential to the further development of television.

== "Paul Nipkow" Transmitter ==
The world's first regular television service, started in Berlin in 1935, was named Fernsehsender "Paul Nipkow" after Nipkow – the "spiritual father" of the core element of first-generation television technology. He became honorary president of the "television council" of the "Imperial Broadcasting Chamber". Nipkow's glory was used by Hitler and the Nazi government as a tool of National Socialist scientific propaganda. Nipkow died in Berlin in 1940 two days after his 80th birthday and had an official ceremony organised by the Nazi government.

== See also ==
- German inventors and discoverers
- History of television

== Bibliography ==
SCHMIDT, Claus-Dietrich, Paul Nipkow. Erfinder des Fernsehens (1860–1940). Sein Leben in den technischen Fortschritt, Lębork Museum, 2009. The only detailed biography on Nipkow.
