= Nipkow disk =

Image scanning device

Schematic showing the circular paths traced by the holes in a Nipkow disk

A Nipkow disk (sometimes Anglicized as Nipkov disk; patented in 1884), also known as scanning disk, is a mechanical, rotating, geometrically operating image scanning device, patented by Paul Gottlieb Nipkow in Berlin. This scanning disk was a fundamental component in mechanical television, and thus the first televisions, through the 1920s and 1930s.

== Operation ==
The device is a mechanically spinning disk of any suitable material (metal, plastic, cardboard, etc.), with a series of equally-distanced circular holes of equal diameter drilled in it. The holes may also be square for greater precision. These holes are positioned to form a single-turn spiral starting from an external radial point of the disk and proceeding to the center of the disk. When the disk rotates, the holes trace circular ring patterns, with inner and outer diameter depending on each hole's position on the disk and thickness equal to each hole's diameter. The patterns may or may not partially overlap, depending on the exact construction of the disk. A lens projects an image of the scene in front of it directly onto the disk. Each hole in the spiral takes a "slice" through the image which is picked up as a temporal pattern of light and dark by a sensor. If the sensor is made to control a light behind a second Nipkow disk rotating synchronously at the same speed and in the same direction, the image will be reproduced line-by-line. The size of the reproduced image is again determined by the size of the disc; a larger disc produces a larger image.

When spinning the disk while observing an object "through" the disk, preferably through a relatively small circular sector of the disk (the viewport), for example, an angular quarter or eighth of the disk, the object seems "scanned" line by line, first by length or height or even diagonally, depending on the exact sector chosen for observation. By spinning the disk rapidly enough, the object seems complete and capturing of motion becomes possible. This can be intuitively understood by covering all of the disk but a small rectangular area with black cardboard (which stays fixed), spinning the disk and observing an object through the small area.

== Advantages ==
One of the advantages of using a Nipkow disk is that the image sensor (that is, the device converting light to electric signals) can be as simple as a single photocell or photodiode, since at each instant only a very small area is visible through the disk (and viewport), and so decomposing an image into lines is done almost by itself with little need for scanline timing, and very high scanline resolution. A simple acquisition device can be built by using an electrical motor driving a Nipkow disk, a small box containing a single light-sensitive (electric) element and a conventional image focusing device (lens, dark box, etc.).

Another advantage is that the receiving device is very similar to the acquisition device, except that the light-sensitive device is replaced by a variable light source, driven by the signal provided by the acquisition device. Some means of synchronizing the disks on the two devices must also be devised (several options are possible, ranging from manual to electronic control signals).

These facts helped immensely in building the first mechanical television accomplished by the Scottish inventor John Logie Baird, as well as the first "TV-Enthusiasts" communities and even experimental image radio broadcasts in the 1920s.

== Disadvantages ==
The resolution along a Nipkow disk's scanline is potentially very high, being an analogue scan. However the maximum number of scanlines is much more limited, being equal to the number of holes on the disk, which in practice ranged from 30 to 100, with rare 200-hole disks tested.

Another drawback of the Nipkow disk as an image scanning device: the scanlines are not straight lines, but rather curves. So the ideal Nipkow disk should have either a very large diameter, which means smaller curvature, or a very narrow angular opening of its viewport. Another way to produce acceptable images would be to drill smaller holes (millimeter or even micrometer scale) closer to the outer sectors of the disk, but technological evolution favoured electronic means of image acquisition.

Another significant disadvantage lay with reproducing images at the receiving end of the transmission which was also accomplished with a Nipkow disk. The images were typically very small, as small as the surface used for scanning, which, with the practical implementations of mechanical television, were the size of a postage-stamp in the case of a 30 to 50 cm diameter disk.

Further disadvantages include the non-linear geometry of the scanned images, and the impractical size of the disk, at least in the past. The Nipkow disks used in early TV receivers were roughly 30 cm to 50 cm in diameter, with 30 to 50 holes. The devices using them were also noisy and heavy with very low picture quality and a great deal of flickering. The acquisition part of the system was not much better, requiring very powerful lighting of the subject.

Disk scanners share a major limitation with the Farnsworth image dissector. Light is conveyed into the sensing system as the small aperture scans over the entire field of view. The actual amount of light gathered is instantaneous, occurring through a very small aperture, and the net yield is only a microscopic percentage of the incident energy.

Iconoscopes (and their successors) accumulate energy on the target continuously, thereby integrating energy over time. The scanning system simply "picks off" the accumulated charge as it sweeps past each site on the target. Simple calculations show that, for equally sensitive photosensitive receptors, the iconoscope is hundreds to thousands of times more sensitive than the disk or the Farnsworth scanner.

The scanning disk can be replaced by a polygonal mirror, but this suffers from the same problem – lack of integration over time.

== Applications ==
Apart from the aforementioned mechanical television, which did not become popular for the practical reasons mentioned above, a Nipkow disk is used in one type of confocal microscopy, a type of fluorescence microscopy.
