= List of experimental television stations =

This page is a list of the experimental television stations before 1946. After 1945 (in the United States) the television frequencies were opened up to commercialization and regular broadcasts began. Regular broadcast television start dates vary widely by country; in many regions, initial broadcast video deployment was delayed due to mobilisation for World War II.

(Note: The listing of current broadcast channels for these stations is not up-to-date as many low-VHF stations have moved to UHF frequencies as a result of digital television transition. This is less of an issue in the United Kingdom because of its all-UHF system, but most early US broadcasters were on affected channels before analogue shutdown. Very few full-service North American broadcasters remain on physical channels VHF 2-6 digitally due to impulse noise problems and strict limits on maximum transmitted power at these frequencies.)

== Television stations, as of 1928 ==
Television stations, as of 1928 United States
Television call-sign (original)	Television call-sign (current)	City or location	Owner	Transmitter antenna height	Television frequency	Television channel (current)	On air	Off air	Disk holes or lines	Frame rate (frame/s)	Original broadcast system	Current broadcast system
WGY	WRGB-TV	Schenectady, New York	General Electric	380 m	790 kHz	Channel 6 (VHF)	May 10, 1928	Present	48	Unknown	Mechanical television	ATSC
WRNY	None	New York City	Experimenter Publishing	326 m	920 kHz	None	August 13, 1928	1929	48	7.5	Mechanical television	None
2XAL	None	New York City	Experimenter Publishing	(with WRNY), 30.91	9.7 MHz	None	August 13, 1928	1929	48	7.5	Mechanical television	None
3XK	None	Washington, D.C.	Charles Jenkins Laboratories	46.7 m	1.605 MHz	None	July 2, 1928	1932 (1934?)	48	Unknown	Mechanical television	None
WOR	WWOR-TV	Secaucus, New Jersey formerly New York City	Bamberger Broadcasting (from WOR)	405 m	740 kHz	Channel 9 (VHF)	Unknown	Unknown	Unknown	Unknown	Mechanical television	ATSC
KDKA	KDKA-TV	Pittsburgh	Westinghouse Electric Company	62.5 m	4.798 MHz	Channel 2 VHF	Unknown	Unknown	Unknown	Unknown	Mechanical television	ATSC
1XAY	None	Lexington, Massachusetts	WLEX	51–62 m	1.9 to 4.7 MHz	Unknown	Unknown	Unknown	Unknown	Unknown	Mechanical television	None
4XA	None	Memphis, Tennessee	WSM	120–125 m	2.1–2.5 MHz	Unknown	Unknown	Unknown	Unknown	Unknown	Mechanical television	None
9XAA (short-wave station of WCFL, officially W9XAA)	None	Chicago	WCFL/Chicago Federation of Labor	61.25 m	4.8 MHz	Unknown	June 19, 1928	1937	48	15	Mechanical television	None
Television stations, as of December 1928 United States
Television call-sign (original)	Television call-sign (current)	City or location	Owner	Transmitter antenna height (m)	Television frequency	Television channel (current)	On air	Off air	Disk holes or lines	frame rate (frame/s)	Original broadcast system	Current broadcast system
WGY	WRGB-TV	Schenectady, New York	General Electric	380 m	379.5 MHz	Channel 6 (VHF)	1928	Still on air	24	21	Mechanical Television	ATSC
2XAF (Upgrade of WGY)	WRGB-TV	Schenectady, New York	General Electric	380 m	31.4 MHz	Channel 6 (VHF)	1928	Still on air	24	21	Mechanical Television	ATSC
2XAD (upgrade of W2XAF above)	WRGB-TV	Schenectady, New York	General Electric	Channel 6 (VHF)	21.96 MHz	Channel 6 (VHF)	1928	Still on air	24	21	Mechanical Television	ATSC
WRNY	None	New York City	Experimenter Publishing	326 m	920 kHz	None	August 13, 1928	1929	48	7.5	Mechanical television	None
2XAL	None	New York City	Experimenter Publishing	(with WRNY), 30.91	9.7 MHz	None	August 13, 1928	1929	48	7.5	Mechanical television	None
3XK	None	Washington, D.C.	Charles Jenkins Laboratories	Unknown	46.72 MHz	None	July 2, 1928	1932 (1934?)	48	15	Mechanical television	None
W9XAA WCFL	None	Chicago	Chicago Federation of Labor	61.25 m	61.5 MHz	Unknown	June 19, 1928	1937	45	15	Mechanical television	None
WKBI-TV	None	Chicago	Unknown	?	215.7 MHz	?	?	?	48	15	Mechanical television	None
WIBO-lost license May 15, 1933; AKA W9XAO	None	Chicago	Western Television (Sanabria)	?	305.9 MHz	?	Summer 1929	1933	45	15	Mechanical television	None
KGFJ	None	Los Angeles	?	?	212.6 MHz	?	?	?	48	--	Mechanical television	None
WLBX	None	Lexington, Massachusetts	?	?	62.5 MHz	?	?	?	48	--	Mechanical television	None

== Television stations, from 1928 to 1939 ==
Television stations, from 1928 to 1939 United States
Television call-sign (original)	Television call-sign (current)	City or location	Owner	Television frequency	Television channel (current)	On air	Off air	Disk holes or lines	frame rate (frame/s)	Original broadcast system	Current broadcast system
W9XZV	None	Chicago, IL	Zenith	2.1-2.2 MHz, later Channel 2	None	1939, with a later Zenith experimental station in 1951	1953?	?	?	Electronic television	None
W1WX (later became W1XAV)	None	Boston	SW and Television (Hollis Baird)	2120 kHz	None	April 1929 (became W1XAV in December 1929)	1931	48 (and later, 60 lines)	15	Mechanical Television	None
W1XAV	None	Boston	SW and Television (Hollis Baird)	2.1-2.2 MHz	None	1930	1931	48	15	Mechanical television	None
W1XAV	None	Boston	Unknown	2.1-2.2 MHz	SW and Television (Hollis Baird)	1931	1934	60	20	Mechanical television	None
W1XAY	None	Lexington, Massachusetts	Boston Post, WLEX	2.0-2.1 MHz	None	1928	1930	48	18	Mechanical Television	None
W2XB/WGY/W2XAF/W2XAD	WRGB	Schenectady, NY	General Electric	2.1-2.2 MHz	VHF 6	1928	?	48	20	Mechanical television	ATSC
W2XCR	None	New York City	Charles Jenkins Laboratories	2.75-2.85 MHz	None	1929	1931	48	15	Mechanical Television	None
W2XCR	None	New York City	Charles Jenkins Laboratories	2.75-2.85 MHz	None	1931	1933	60	20	Mechanical Television	None
W2XBS	WNBC-TV	New York City	RCA	2.0-2.1 MHz	Channel 4 (VHF)	1928	1929	60?	20?	Mechanical television	ATSC
W2XBS	WNBC-TV	New York City	RCA	2.75-2.85 MHz	Channel 4 (VHF)	1928	1929	60	20	Mechanical television	ATSC
W2XAB	WCBS-TV	New York City	CBS	2.1-2.2 MHz	Channel 2	1931	1933	60	20	Mechanical television	ATSC
WRNY	None	New York City	Unknown	1010 kHz	None	1928	1929	36	?	Mechanical Television	None
WRNY	None	New York City	Unknown	1010 kHz	None	1928	?	48	10	Mechanical television	None
W2XR	None	Long Island City, New York	Hogan's Radio Pictures	2.85-2.95 MHz	None	March 26, 1929	1934	60	20	Mechanical television	None
W3XK	None	Wheaton, Maryland (later moved to Silver Spring, Maryland)	Charles Jenkins Laboratories	6420 kHz (6.42 MHz)	None	1928	1931	48	15	Mechanical television	None
W3XK	None	Washington, D.C.	Charles Jenkins Laboratories	2.0-2.1 MHz	None	1931	1934	60	20	Mechanical Television	None
W9XX, later became W5XA	None	Shreveport, Louisiana	Rev. Lannie W. Stewart	1604 kHz	None	1929	1934	45	15	Mechanical Television	None
W5XA	None	Shreveport, Louisiana	Paul L. Carriger	1594 kHz (video on the 160-meter amateur band)	None	1932	1934	45	15	Mechanical television	None
W6XAH	None	Bakersfield, California	Pioneer Mercantile Company	2000–2100 kHz, also simulcast on 1550 kHz in 1932	None	January 6, 1932	1935	96	20	Mechanical television	None
W9XR	None	Downers Grove, Illinois (Chicago)	Great Lakes Broadcasting/ National Broadcasting Company after 1931.	2.85-2.95 mHz	None	1929	1933	24	15	Mechanical television	None
Television stations, from 1928 to 1939 United States and Canada
Television call-sign (original)	Television call-sign (current)	City or location	Owner	Television frequency	Television channel (current)	On air	Off air	Disk holes or lines	frame rate (frame/s)	Original broadcast system	Current broadcast system
KGFJ	None	Los Angeles	Unknown	?	?	1928	?	48	?	Mechanical television	None
W3XAD	None	Camden, New Jersey	RCA	124 MHz to 130 MHz	Channel 5	July 1930	Became W3XEP	525	30	Unknown	None
W6XS	None	Los Angeles	Don Lee Broadcasting	2.1-2.2 MHz	?	1931	1935	80	20	Mechanical Television	None
W6XAO	KCBS-TV	Los Angeles	Don Lee Broadcasting	44.5 MHz (44-50 MHz, Channel 1)	Channel 2	December 23, 1931	1936	80	20	Mechanical Television	ATSC
W7XAO	None	Portland, Oregon	Wilbur Jerman	2.75-2.85 MHz	?	1929	?	Unknown	Unknown	Mechanical Television	None
W9XAA, WCFL	None	Chicago	Chicago Federation of Labor	2.0-2.1 MHz	None	June 19, 1928	1937	45	15	Mechanical Television	None
WIBO-lost license May 15, 1933; AKA W9XAO	None	Chicago, IL	Western Television (Sanabria)	?	?	Summer 1929	1933	45	15	Mechanical Television	None
W9XAK	?	Manhattan, Kansas	Kansas State College	2.1-2.2 MHz	?	1932	1939	60	20	Mechanical Television	None?
W9XAL	Unknown	Kansas City, Missouri	First National Television	2.1-2.2 MHz	?	1933	1935	45	15	Mechanical Television	None?
W9XAO	None	Chicago, IL	Western Television (Sanabria)	2.0-2.1 MHz	?	Summer 1929	1933	45	15	Mechanical Television	None?
W9XAP	WMAQ-TV	Chicago, IL	Chicago Daily News/National Broadcasting Company(after 1 November 1931)	2.1-2.2 MHz	Channel 5	August 27, 1930	August 1933	45	15	Mechanical Television	ATSC
W9XAT	Unknown	Minneapolis, MN	George Young, radio station WDGY	42-50 MHz, 60-86 MHz (Channel 1)	?	1933	1938	125	?	Mechanical Television	None?
W9XD	WTMJ-TV	Milwaukee, WI	Milwaukee Journal	?	?	1931 (transmitter used for Apex radio station W9XAZ in 1934)	Experiments ended 1933; License deleted in 1938	45	15	Mechanical Television- Western	
W9XG	?	Lafayette, IN	Purdue University	2.75-2.85 MHz	?	1931	1939	60	24	Mechanical Television	?
W9XK/W9SUI "WSUI", W9XAZ	?	Iowa City, IA	State University of Iowa	2.0-2.1 MHz	?	1933	1939	45	15	Mechanical Television	?
W9XUI	?	Iowa City, IA	State University of Iowa	2.0-2.1 MHz, later Channel 1, then Channel 2	?	1933	1941	441	30	Mechanical Television	?
W2XJT	None	Jamaica, New York	Jamaica Radio Television Company	Channel 3, then Channel 13	None	1940, moved to Ch. 13 in 1945	Unknown	?	?	Mechanical Television	None
VE9EC (also given as VE9AK)	None; TV returned in 1952 with CBFT	Montreal, Quebec	Peck Television Corp. (Canadian Television Ltd.)	41 MHz	None	1931	1935	60–150	Unknown	Mechanical television	VE9AK's calls were reassigned to CFRB-FM in 1938
Television stations, from 1928 to 1939 Europe
Television call-sign (original)	Television call-sign (current)	City or location	Owner	Television frequency	Television channel (current)	On air	Off air	Disk holes or lines	frame rate (frame/s)	Original broadcast system	Current broadcast system
Baird Television Ltd. via BBC transmitter 2LO	Unknown	London, England	Baird Television Ltd.	Unknown	?	September 30, 1929	June 1932	30	25	Mechanical television	PAL/DVB-T?
Unknown (Possibly 2LO, as above?)	BBC One	London, England	Baird Television Ltd.	?	?	August 22, 1932	September 11, 1935	30	25	Mechanical television	PAL
Fernsehsender Paul Nipkow	Unknown	Berlin, Germany	Reichs-Rundfunk-Gesellschaft	?	?	1935 (tests started in 1929)	1944	180/441 beginning in 1937	25	Electronic television	PAL?
Doświadczalna Stacja Telewizyjna	TVP 1	Warsaw, Poland	Polskie Radio Sp. Akc.	?		September 1937 (according to other sources regular broadcasts started in 1938)	last week of August 1939	120	25	Mechanical television	

== Television stations, as of 1941 ==
Television stations, as of 1941 United States
Television call-sign (original)	Television call-sign (current)	City or location	Owner	Television frequency	Television channel (current)	On air	Off air	Disk holes or lines	frame rate (frame/s)	Original broadcast system	Current broadcast system
W1XG	None	Boston	General Television	?	Channel 1	Unknown Channel	?	?	Unknown	Mechanical television	None
W2XVT (Becomes W2XWV in 1944)	WNYW	Passaic, New Jersey	DuMont	Channel 4	Channel 5	1938	Still on air	525	30	Mechanical Television	ATSC
W2XBS	WNBC-TV	New York City	RCA, NBC	Channel 1	Channel 4	1932	Still on air	525	30	Mechanical Television	ATSC
W2XAB	WCBS-TV	New York City	CBS	Channel 2	Channel 2	1931	Still on air	525	30	Mechanical Television	ATSC
W2XWV	WNYW-TV	New York City	DuMont	Channel 4	Channel 5	1938	Still on air	525	30	Mechanical Television	ATSC
W2XB	WRGB	Schenectady, NY	General Electric	Channel 3	Channel 6	1939	Still on air	525	30	Mechanical Television	ATSC
W3XWT	WTTG	Washington, D.C.	DuMont	Channel 1	Channel 5	1941	Still on air	525	30	Mechanical Television	ATSC
W3XNB	WRC-TV	Washington, D.C.	NBC	Channel 2	Channel 4	1939	Still on air	525	30	Mechanical Television	ATSC
W3XE	KYW-TV	Philadelphia	Philco	Channel 3	Channel 3	1932	Still on air	525	30	Mechanical Television	ATSC
W3XEP	None	Camden, NJ	RCA	42 MHz-56 MHz and 50-86 MHz	None	1931	1941?	525	30	Mechanical television	None
W3XPF (Portable unit: W10XX)	None?	Philadelphia	Farnsworth	Channel 3	Unknown	1937	Unknown	525	30	Mechanical Television	Unknown
W3XPP	Cancelled Permit, Now WCAU	Philadelphia	NBC	Channel 7	Channel 10	1939	Unknown	None	None	Mechanical Television	ATSC
W6XAO	KCBS-TV	Los Angeles	Don Lee Broadcasting	Channel 1	Channel 2	1936	Still on air	441, changed to 525 in late 1941	30	Mechanical Television	ATSC
W6XYZ	KTLA	Los Angeles	Television Productions	Channel 4	Channel 5	1942	Still on air	525	30	Mechanical Television	ATSC
W6XDL	None	San Francisco, CA	Don Lee Broadcasting	Channel 1	None	1941	Off-Air	525	30	Mechanical Television	None
W8XCT	WLWT-TV	Cincinnati, OH	Crosley Broadcasting	Channel 1	Channel 5	1939	Still on air	525	30	Mechanical Television	ATSC
W9XV/W9XZV	Became KS2XBS	Chicago, IL	Zenith	Channel 1, then CH 2	None	1939–1941, 1951–1953 as KS2XBS	Off-Air	441, later 525	30	Electronic television	None
W9XBK	WBBM-TV	Chicago, IL	Balaban and Katz	Channel 2	Channel 2	1940	Still on air	525	30	Mechanical Television	ATSC
W9XMJ		Milwaukee, WI	The Journal Co.	Channel 3		1940		525	30		
WMJT		Milwaukee, WI	The Journal Co.	Channel 3		1941	CP returned in 1946	525	30		

== Television stations, from Jan. 3, 1945 to 1955 ==
Television stations, from Jan. 3, 1945 to 1955 United States
Television call-sign (original)	Television call-sign (current)	City or location	Owner	Television frequency	Television channel (current)	On air	Off air	Disk holes or lines	frame rate (frame/s)	Original broadcast system	Current broadcast system
W6XAO	KTSL (Now KCBS-TV)	Hollywood, California/Los Angeles, California	Don Lee Broadcasting	Channel 1	2.1 (UHF 43)	1931	Still on air	525	30	Mechanical television	Now ATSC
W6XHH	None	Los Angeles	Hughes Tool Company	2	None	None	None	525	30	Mechanical television	None
W6XZY	KTLA-TV	Los Angeles	Television Productions, Inc.	4	5.1 (UHF 31)	1942	Still on air	525	30	Mechanical television	Now ATSC
KSEE	None	Los Angeles	Earl Anthony, Inc.	6	None	Unknown	off-air	525	30	Mechanical television	None
W6XHT	None	San Francisco, CA	Hughes Tool Company	2	None	Unknown	off-air	525	30	Mechanical television	None
W3XWT	WTTG	Washington, D.C.	DuMont Labs, Inc.	Channel 1	5.1 (UHF 36)	1941	Still on air	525	30	Mechanical television	Now ATSC
WNBW	WRC-TV	Washington, D.C.	NBC	2	4.1 (UHF 48)	1941	Still on air	525	30	Mechanical television	Now ATSC
W9ZV/W9XZV	None	Chicago, IL	Zenith Radio Corp.	Channel 1, then Channel 2	None	1939–1941, 1951–1953 as KS2XBS	Off-Air	525	30	Mechanical Television	None
W9XAP	WNBQ-TV; 1948-1964 WMAQ-TV; 1964-	Chicago, IL	National Broadcasting Company	Channel 5	5.1 (UHF 29)	August 27, 1930	On-Air	525	30	Mechanical Television	Now ATSC
W9XBK	Became W9XCB, then WBKB, now WBBM-TV	Chicago, IL	Balaban and Katz Corp.	Channel 2	2.1 (VHF 12)	1940	Still on air	525	30	Mechanical television	Now ATSC
W9XCB	WBBM-TV	Chicago, IL	CBS	Channel 4	2.1 (VHF 12)	1940	Still on air	525	30	Mechanical television	Now ATSC
W9XG		West Lafayette, IN	Purdue University	3	None	1930	1946?	525	30	Mechanical television	None
W9SUI		Iowa City, IA	University of Iowa	Channel 1, later Channel 12	None	1931	1941?	525	30	Mechanical television	None
W1XG		Boston	General Television Corp.	Channel 1	None	1931	1941?	525	30	Mechanical television	None
W3XEP	None	Camden, New Jersey	RCA	5, 10, 12	None	July, 1931 (as portable W3XAD)	1941?	525	30	Mechanical television	None
W2XVT	WNYW	Passaic, New Jersey	DuMont Laboratories	Channel 4	5.1 (UHF 44)	1938	Became W2XWV in 1944	525	30	Mechanical television	Now ATSC
W2XWV	WNYW	Passaic, New Jersey	DuMont Laboratories	Channel 4	5.1 (UHF 44)	1944	Became WABD-TV in 1944	525	30	Mechanical television	Now ATSC
W2XJT	None	Jamaica, New York	Jamaica Radio & TV Corp.	Channel 3, then Channel 13	None	1940, moved to Ch. 13 in 1945	1947?	Unknown	Unknown	Mechanical television	None
WNBT	WNBC-TV	New York City	NBC	Channel 1	4.1 (UHF 28)	1928 (as W2XBS)	Still on air	525	30	Mechanical television	Now ATSC
WCBW	WCBS	New York City	CBS	Channel 2	2.1 (UHF 33)	1938 (as W2XAB)	Still on air	525	30	Mechanical television	Now ATSC
WABD	WNYW-TV	New York City	DuMont Labs, Inc.	Channel 4	5.1 (UHF 44)	1938 (as W2XVT, then W2XWV)	Still on air	525	30	Mechanical television	Now ATSC
W2XXB		New York City	Bamberger Broadcasting Svc.	6			Experimental				
W2XMT		New York City	Metropolitan Television Inc.	8			Experimental				
WRGB	WRGB-TV	Schenectady, NY	General Electric	3	6.1 (VHF 6)		Still on-air	525	30	Mechanical television	Now ATSC
W8XCT		Cincinnati, OH	Crosley Corporation	1			Experimental				
W3XE (later WPTZ)	KYW-TV	Philadelphia	Philco Radio & TV	3	3.1 (UHF 26)	Sept 1, 1941	On-air	525	30	Mechanical television	Now ATSC, Westinghouse CBS O&O
W3XAU		Philadelphia	WCAU Broadcasting Co.	5			Experimental				WCAU now operates an ATSC commercial station
W8XGZ		Charleston, WV	Gus Zaharis	1			Experimental				
KS2XBS (First pay-TV service, "PhoneVision")	None	Chicago, IL	Zenith	2.1-2.2 MHz, later Channel 2	None	1951	1953?	525	30	Electronic television	None
KC2XAK	None, now part of WNBC-TV	Bridgeport, Connecticut	RCA/NBC	UHF 24	None	December 29, 1949	August 23, 1952	525	30	NTSC-M	None. Parent station is now ATSC
KPTV	KPTV	Portland, Oregon	Empire Coil Company	Channel 27	12.1 (VHF 12)	September 20, 1952	Still on air	525	30	Used KC2XAK's NTSC-M UHF transmitter, otherwise not experimental.	Now ATSC VHF
KE2XDR		New York City	DuMont Labs			1950	1951			Mechanical television	None
KPHO	KPHO	Phoenix, Arizona	Gray Television	5	5	1949		525	30		

== See also ==
- Timeline of the BBC
- History of television
- Timeline of the introduction of television in countries
- Timeline of the introduction of color television in countries
- Geographical usage of television
- Oldest radio station
- Narrow-bandwidth television
- Prewar television stations
- Television systems before 1940

=== Individual television stations ===
- WRGB
- WNBC-TV
- WCBS-TV
- KCBS-TV
- BBC / BBC Television

=== Broadcast television systems ===
- Television systems before 1940
- NTSC
- PAL
- SECAM
- ATSC and DVB-T
