= Vitascope =

Edison film projection system

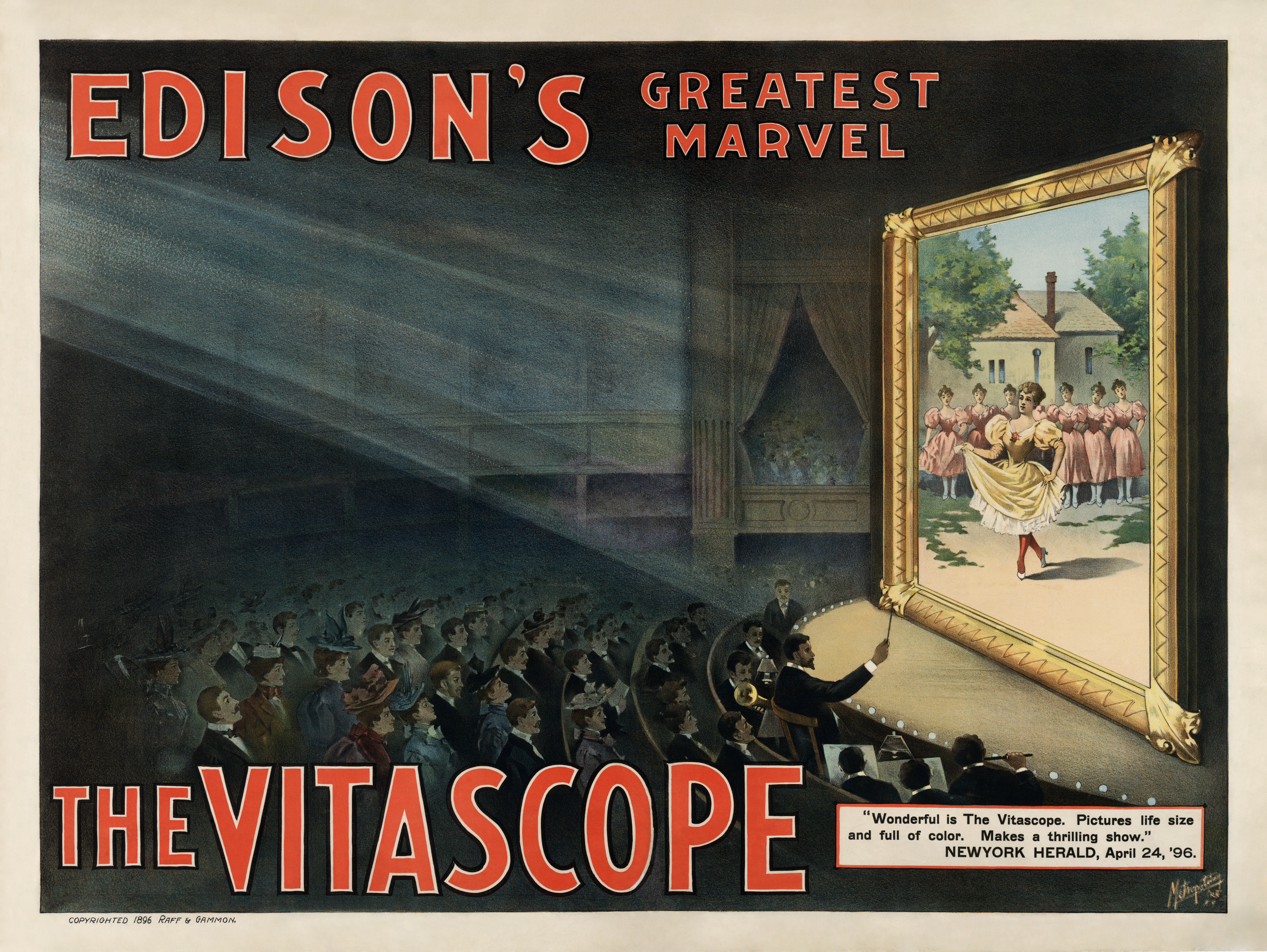
1896 poster advertising the Vitascope

Vitascope was an early film projector first demonstrated in 1895 by Charles Francis Jenkins and Thomas Armat. They had made modifications to Jenkins' patented Phantoscope, which cast images via film and electric light onto a wall or screen. The Vitascope is a large electrically-powered projector that uses light to cast images. The images being cast are originally taken by a kinetoscope mechanism onto gelatin film. Using an intermittent mechanism, the film negatives produced up to fifty frames per second. The shutter opens and closes to reveal new images. This device can produce up to 3,000 negatives per minute. With the original Phantoscope and before he partnered with Armat, Jenkins displayed the earliest documented projection of a filmed motion picture in June 1894 in Richmond, Indiana.

Armat independently sold the Phantoscope to The Kinetoscope Company. The company realized that their Kinetoscope would soon be a thing of the past with the rapidly advancing proliferation of early cinematic engineering. By 1897, just two years after the Vitascope was first demonstrated, the technology was being nationally adopted. Hawaii and Texas were among the first to incorporate the Vitascope into their picture shows.

Vitascope was also used briefly as a trademark by Warner Brothers in 1930 for a widescreen process used for films such as Song of the Flame. Warner was trying to compete with other widescreen processes such as Magnascope, Widevision, Natural Vision (no relation to the later 3-D film process), and Fox Grandeur.

== History ==
Thomas Edison was slow to develop a projection system at this time, since his company's single-user Kinetoscopes were very profitable. However, films projected for large audiences could generate more profits since fewer machines were needed in proportion to the number of viewers. Thus, others sought to develop their own projection systems.

One inventor who led the way was Charles Francis Jenkins who created the Phantoscope. Jenkins was behind the earliest documented projection of a motion picture before an audience. Using film and electric light, the film of a vaudeville dancer was projected in Richmond, Indiana on June 6, 1894. Woodville Latham, with his sons, created the Eidoloscope projector which was presented publicly in April 1895. William Kennedy Dickson apparently advised the Lathams on their machine, offering technical knowledge, a situation which led to Dickson leaving Edison's employment on April 2, 1895.

Dickson formed the American Mutoscope Company in December 1895 with partners Herman Casler, Henry Norton Marvin, and Elias Koopman. The company, which eventually became the American Mutoscope and Biograph Company, soon became a major competitor to the Edison Company.

During the same period, C. Francis Jenkins and Thomas Armat modified Jenkins' patented Phantoscope. It was publicly demonstrated in Atlanta in the Autumn of 1895 at the Cotton States Exposition. The two soon parted ways, each claiming credit for the invention.

Armat showed the Phantoscope to Raff & Gammon, owners of the Kinetoscope Company, who recognized its profit potential in the face of declining kinetoscope business. They negotiated with Armat to purchase rights to the Phantoscope and approached Edison for his approval. The Edison Manufacturing Company agreed to manufacture the machine and to produce films for it, but on the condition it be advertised as a new Edison invention named the Vitascope. Edison skeptics argue that the Vitascope has a jaded past. In addition, critics claim the Vitascope was nothing more than a repackaging of the phantoscope with slight modifications.

The Vitascope's first theatrical exhibition was on April 23, 1896, at Koster and Bial's Music Hall in New York City. Other competitors soon displayed their own projection systems in American theaters, including the re-engineered Eidoloscope, which copied Vitascope innovations; the Lumière Cinématographe, which had already debuted in Europe in 1895; Birt Acres' Kineopticon; and the Biograph, which was marketed by the American Mutoscope Company. The premiere of the Vitascope was a quick response to threat of losing a very large amount of money to the Lumiere Cinematographe, which vaudeville managers were about to invest in. Even though the Lumiere Cinematographe existed since 1895, it had not gained popularity in the US yet, as it had already in the UK. People were going crazy for the Lumiere Cinematographe especially in London. Raff and Gammon recognized that they would get more money and positive exposure by releasing their technology ahead of the Lumiere Cinematographe in the United States. After the Vitascope made its infamous debut in Manhattan, the device was distributed across the nation including exhibitions in Boston, Philadelphia, Atlantic City, Portland, Scranton, New Haven, New Orleans, New London, Cleveland, Buffalo, San Francisco, Asbury Park, Baltimore, Detroit, Chicago, Los Angeles and more. The Vitascope exhibition made its way across 25 cities in one summer.

The Vitascope, along with many of the competing projectors, became a popular attraction in variety and vaudeville theaters in cities across the US. Motion pictures soon became starring attractions on the vaudeville bill. Exhibitors could exhibit films from the Edison inventory.

The Edison Company developed its own projector known as the Projectoscope or Projecting Kinetoscope in November 1896, and abandoned marketing the Vitascope.

== Marketing ==
Thomas Edison and Thomas Armat profited greatly while many investors defaulted, even ending up in the red in some cases. Investors lost money on the Vitascope because of how it was marketed for audiences. Raff and Gammon were in charge of franchising in the US and Canada. They would offer investors the opportunity to buy out the rights to use the Vitascope exclusively in their state. This created somewhat of a monopoly effect for a short time and essentially forced audiences to take whatever the exhibitor was giving them. Raff & Gammon put the cart before the horse when they began their marketing campaign. At the time they only had approximately 20 films for Vaudeville managers to use. They did not have the resources to continually update the audience’s cinematic experience with new films.

== See also ==
- List of film formats

== Archives and records ==
- Raff and Gammon records at Baker Library Special Collections, Harvard Business School
