= Raff & Gammon =

Film distribution company in the silent film era

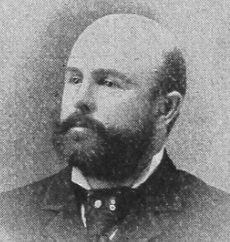
An image of Norman Raff. Taken around October 1896.

Norman C. Raff and Frank R. Gammon were two American businessmen who were known for distributing and promoting some of the Edison Studio films, and founding their own business, which was called The Kinetoscope Company.

== History ==
"Bucking Broncho", a film promoted by Raff & Gammon.

=== Kinetoscope company ===
In August 1894, Raff & Gammon earned rights to start selling Kinetoscopes. One of their employees, Alfred Clark, made the company more popular by making new movies. In 1895, the Kinetoscope started to fade and became less popular with new film technology being created. In 1896, C. Francis Jenkins and Thomas Armat invented the Phantoscope. They showed the Phantoscope to Raff & Gammon, who were interested in it, so they agreed for the rights to the Phantoscope. They later showed this to the Thomas Edison Manufacturing Company, who started manufacturing the machine with permission. They then renamed the machine "The Edison Vitascope". They founded the Kinetoscope company (which was later renamed "Raff & Gammon") for exclusive rights for different territories and nations.

==== Fall ====
The company began to fall in October 1896, when consumers began purchasing high-quality technology similar to the Phantoscope, and more customers purchased those instead. More specifically, the American Mutoscope Company (better known as the Biograph Company), had produced a new motion picture system, which used more surface area than the Phantoscope. Shortly afterwards, the Biograph became more successful, and Raff & Gammon collapsed by the end of 1897. The rights to the vitascope was bought by George W. Llewellyn shortly before the company ended.

== Filmography ==
- The Pickaninnies (1894)
- Barber Shop (1895)
- The Kiss (1896)

== Archives and records ==
- Raff and Gammon records at Baker Library Special Collections, Harvard Business School.
