= Koster & Bial's Music Hall =

New York City vaudeville theatre

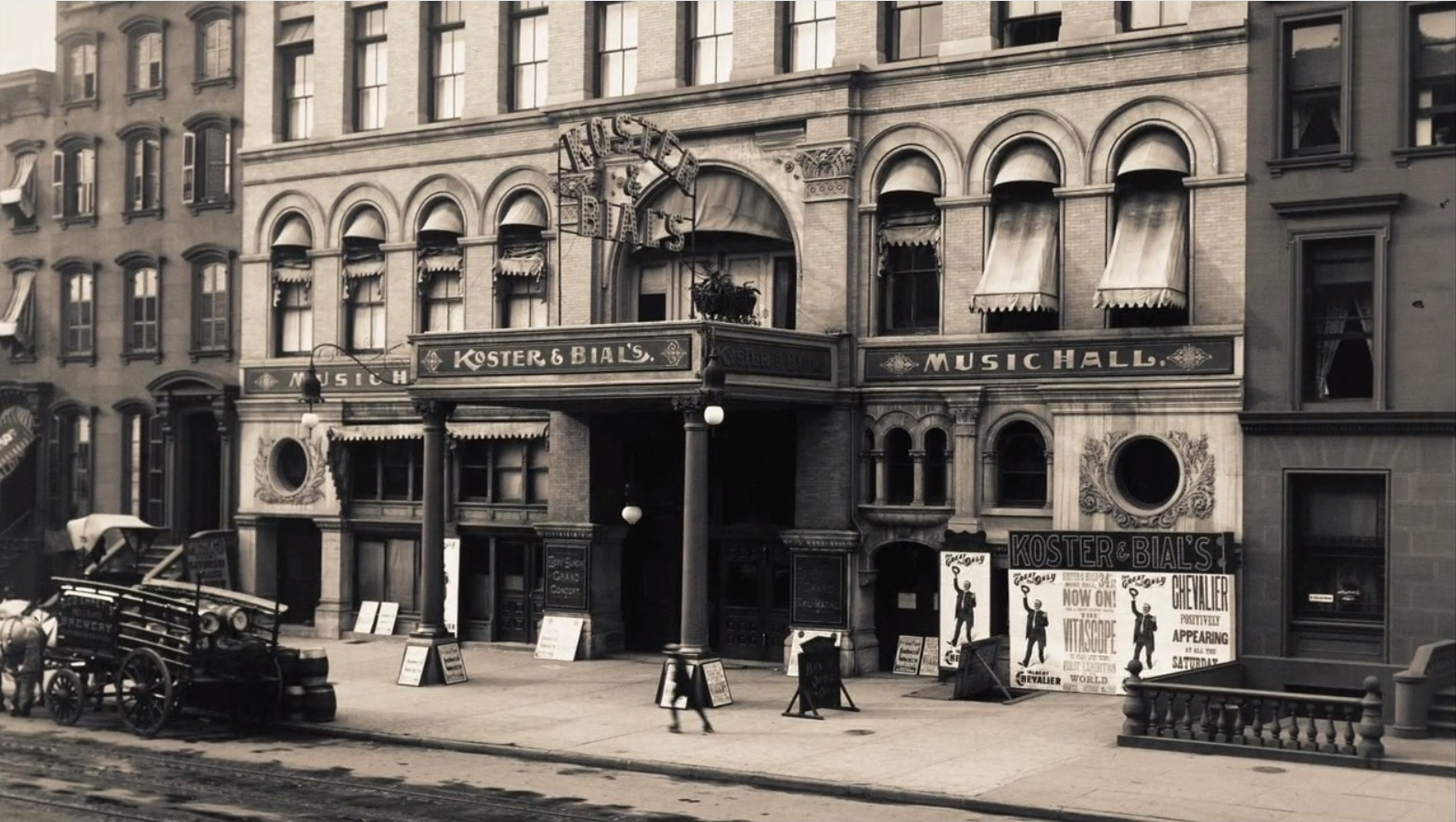
- Interactive map of Koster & Bial's Music Hall

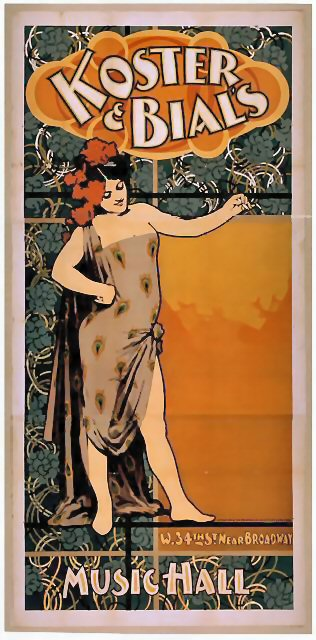
Library of Congress Prints and Photographs

Koster and Bial's Music Hall was an important vaudeville theatre in New York City, located at Broadway and Thirty-Fourth Street, where Macy's flagship store now stands. It had a seating capacity of 3,748, twice the size of many theaters. Ticket prices ranged from 25¢ for a seat in the gallery to $1.50 for one in the orchestra. The venue was founded by John Koster (1844-1895) and Albert Bial (1842-1897) in the late 19th century and closed in 1901.

== History ==
The music hall featured many top performers of its day and is famous in cinema history as the site of the first public exhibition of the Vitascope on April 23, 1896. Albert Bial booked some of the greatest variety and mainly foreign music-hall performers of those days, such as Yvette Guilbert, Eugénie Fougère, Anna Held, Lottie Collins, Marie Lloyd, and Albert Chevalier. They all made their American debuts at Koster and Bial's.

Koster and Bial's Music Hall was the successor to Koster and Bial's Concert Hall on 23rd Street. At that location, Koster and Bial had taken over Bryant's Opera House, a venue for minstrel shows. They offered food and drink along with vaudeville, circumventing a law against serving alcohol in theatres by replacing the curtain with a folding fan.

The last Koster and Bial's Music Hall originated when they moved uptown into the former Manhattan Opera House, a huge theatre built in Herald Square in 1892 by Oscar Hammerstein I in pursuit of his passion for grand opera. Quickly running into financial problems, Hammerstein decided to convert his theatre to a vaudeville format. He offered Koster and Bial a partnership under which he would manage the entertainment and they would manage the food. The new Koster and Bial's Music Hall opened on August 28, 1893 and proved to be very successful. Hammerstein however quarreled with his partners and lawsuits ensued. Ultimately Koster and Bial bought out Hammerstein and operated the theater solely on their own. The theatre finally closed in 1901 and was demolished to make way for Macy's Department Store.

=== The first Vitascope exhibition ===
A small advertisement, mixed in with dozens of other theatre ads in The New York Times on April 19, 1896 read:

KOSTER AND BIAL'S MUSIC HALL, 34th st.
TO-MORROW (MONDAY) NIGHT.
THE ONLY CHEVALIER.
2---NEW SONGS---2
Together with all the other
GREAT FOREIGN STARS.
EXTRA--Due notice will be given of the first
public exhibition of Edison's latest marvel,
THE VITASCOPE.

The Vitascope had actually been invented and developed outside of the Edison organization by Thomas Armat, but by mutual agreement Edison's Kinetograph company acquired, manufactured, and marketed it, and presented it as having been invented by Edison. Pictures were projected on a twenty-foot screen in an ornate gilded frame. On April 24, the Times reported:

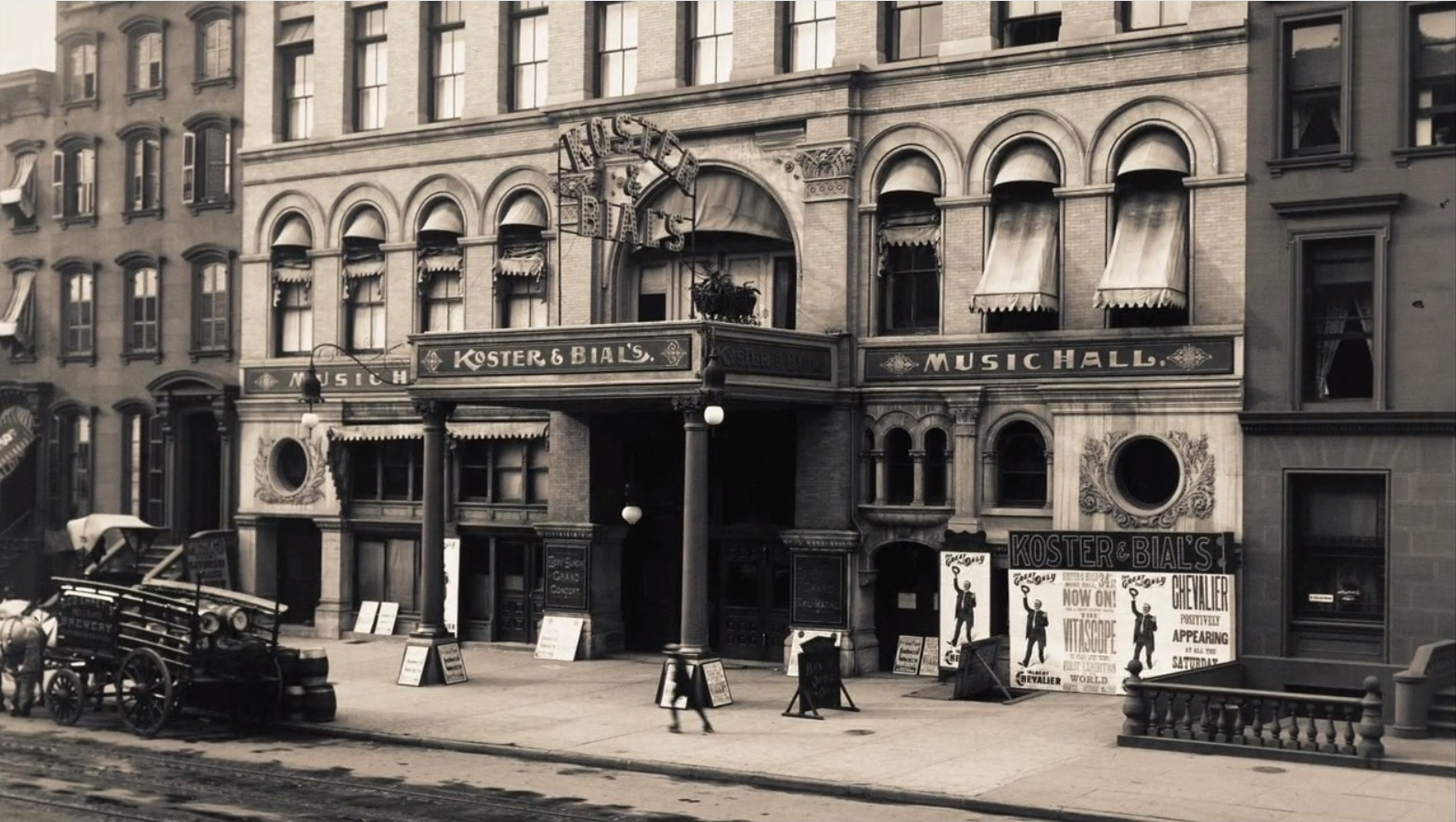

EDISON'S VITASCOPE CHEERED. "Projecting Kinetoscope" Exhibited for First Time at Koster and Bial's. ... The ingenious inventor's latest toy is a projection of his kinetoscope figures in stereopticon fashion on a white screen in a darkened hall. In the center of the balcony of the big music hall is a curious object, which looks from below like the double turret of a big monitor. In the front of each half of it are two oblong holes. The turret is neatly covered with ... blue velvet brocade... The moving figures are about half life size.

...a buzzing and roaring were heard in the turret, and an unusually bright light fell upon the screen. Then came into view two precious blonde young persons of the variety stage in pink and blue dresses, doing the umbrella dance with commendable celerity. Their motions were clearly defined. When they vanished, a view of an angry surf breaking on a sandy beach near a stone pier amazed the spectators. A burlesque boxing match between a tall, thin comedian and a short, fat one, a comic allegory called "The Monroe Doctrine"; an instant of motion in Hoyt's farce, "A Milk White Flag," repeated over and over again, and a skirt dance by a tall blonde completed the views, which were all wonderfully real and singularly exhilarating.

A later Times article mentioned that "[Mr. Edison] has bought, for about $5,000, two ancient, but still serviceable locomotives and several dozen flat cars. He has built about a quarter of a mile of railroad track in a secluded spot, not far from his laboratory. In a few weeks he will start a train from each end of the track, and will run them to a crash... all the incidents of a train wreck will be caught by machines stationed at short intervals near the track."

== See also ==
- White Rats of America

== Sources ==
- Gilbert, Douglas (1942). Lost Chords, The Diverting Story of American Popular Songs. Garden City, N.Y.: Doubleday, Doran and Co., Inc. ISBN 978-0-8154-0370-8
