= W2XCR =

Experimental television station in Long Island City, New York

W2XCR was founded in 1931 in Long Island City, New York by the radio station WGBS (now WINS). During the early part of 1931, but before the call letters were changed to WINS, the station began experimenting with mechanical television broadcasting, operating a Jenkins mechanical scanner through the experimental transmitter, W2XCR. The station broadcast using both 48-line, 15 frame/s, and 60-line, 20 frame/s standards during 1931.

Mechanical TV broadcast in the AM radio band (550–1,500 kHz) in 1928 and 1929. With 24- and 30-line systems, only about 10 kHz of bandwidth was needed, so standard radio channels could be used. Some stations also broadcast in the shortwave band. Beginning in 1930, the 2-3 Mc. band was used for television, with 100 kHz channel width. 60-line systems required about 40 kHz of bandwidth. TV broadcasts could be identified by their distinctive sound.

== See also ==
- List of experimental television stations
- Oldest television station
- Charles Jenkins Laboratories
- W3XK
- W2XBS
