= WRNY (New York City) =

Radio station in New York City (1925–1934)

WRNY was an American AM radio station in New York City that began operating in 1925. It was started by Hugo Gernsback's Experimenter Publishing Company to promote his radio and science magazines. Starting in August 1928, WRNY was one of the first stations to make regularly scheduled experimental television broadcasts. Experimenter Publishing went bankrupt in early 1929 and the station was purchased by the Curtiss Aeroplane and Motor Company to promote aviation. WRNY was deleted in 1934, as part of a consolidation on its shared frequency by surviving station WHN (now WEPN).

== History ==
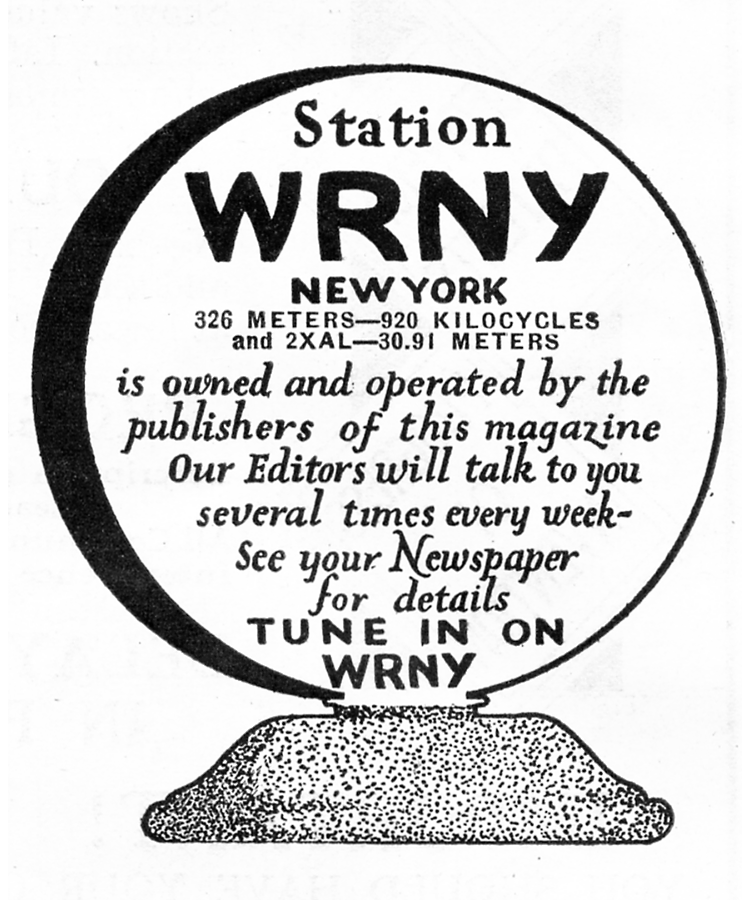
1928 advertisement promoting magazines and radio station

=== Origin ===
Hugo Gernsback was born in Luxembourg and studied electrical engineering in Germany. In 1904 at age 20, Gernsback emigrated to the United States to sell his automotive battery design and to start a mail order radio and electrical components business. The Electro Importing Company catalog soon grew into a magazine, Modern Electrics. The Experimenter Publishing Company was started in 1915 and by the early 1920s was publishing Radio News, Science and Invention, and Practical Electrics magazines. Gernsback included fiction stories in his magazines, and in 1926 launched the first magazine devoted to scientific fiction, Amazing Stories. Experimenter Publishing also published numerous technical and general interest books.

Organized radio broadcasting began in the early 1920s, and by 1925 there were over 500 stations in the United States. In addition to radio equipment manufacturers who established stations to help sell receivers, many publishers started stations. In mid-1925 Experimenter Publishing was granted a license for a New York City station broadcasting on 1160 kHz with the specially requested call sign of WRNY, "signifying Radio News, New York or Roosevelt, New York". The station's state-of-the-art studio was in a hotel room on the 18th floor of the Roosevelt Hotel in New York City, with its 500–watt transmitter located on the hotel roof. The first broadcast was on June 12, 1925. The opening speaker was former Senator Chauncey Depew, followed by the self-described "Father of Radio", Lee de Forest. The evening concluded with two hours of live musical entertainment. Experimenter Publishing used the radio station and the magazines to promote each other. Radio interviews with scientists or other radio notables were reprinted in the magazines, and projects and articles from Gernsback's magazines were discussed on WRNY. The station call letters also appeared on each magazine cover.

By 1927 there were over fifty radio stations and 1.5 million radio sets in the New York metropolitan area. There were so many stations it was common for stations to share the same frequency at different times during the day. At this time radio was regulated by the Department of Commerce, as authorized by the Radio Act of 1912. However, this act did not mention broadcasting, and it was not clear how much control the federal government actually had over station power and frequency assignments. Following a series of court decisions that ruled that the U.S. government had only limited authority, in August 1926 Acting Attorney General William J. Donovan issued a statement concurring with court rulings that stations were currently free to adopt powers and frequencies of their own choosing.

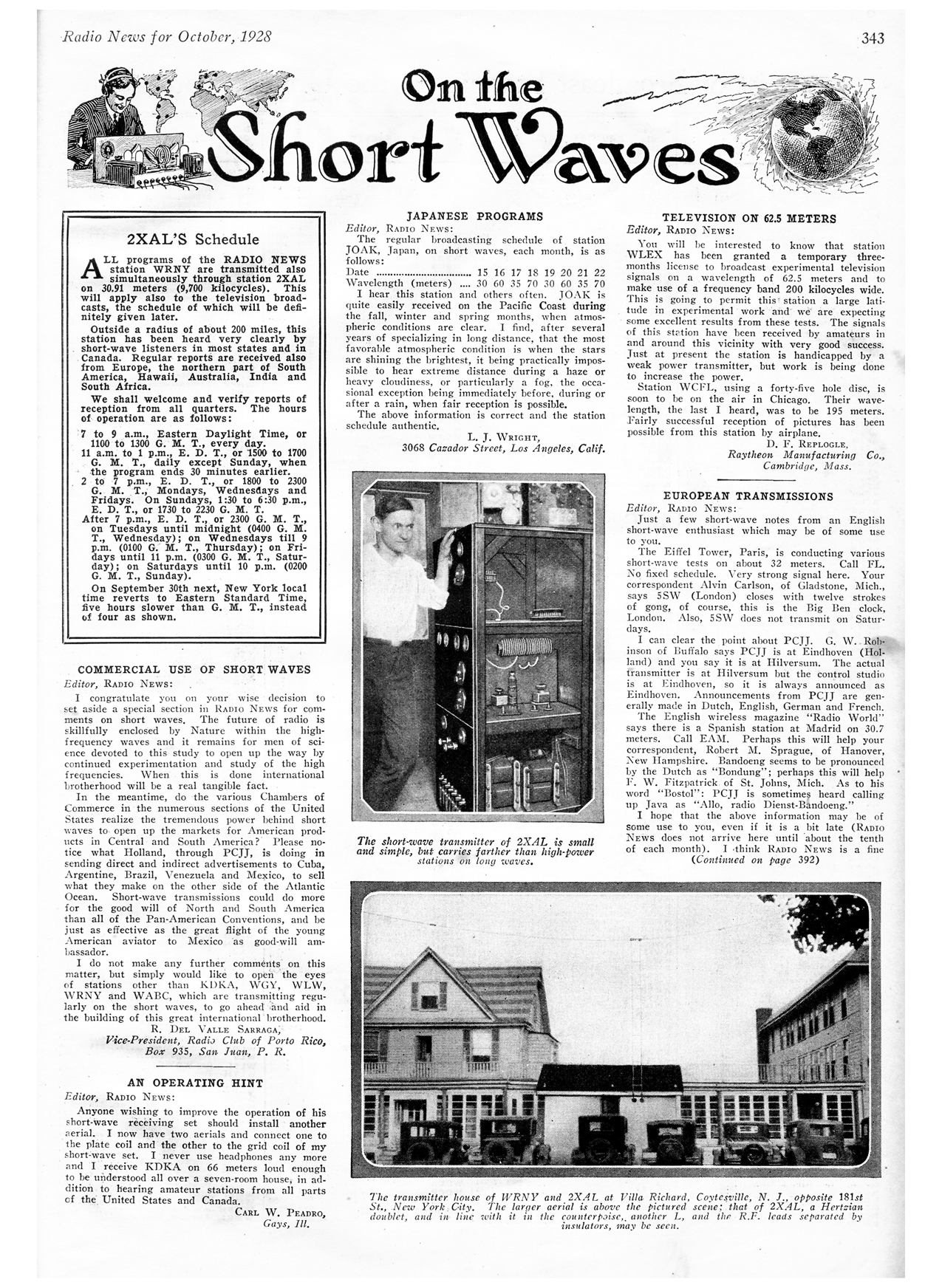
Transmitter site in Coytesville, New Jersey for WRNY and shortwave station 2XAL (1928)

The following November, taking advantage of the temporary regulatory lapse, WRNY relocated its transmitter from the Roosevelt Hotel to Coytesville, New Jersey, across the Hudson River from Manhattan, and began transmitting on 800 kHz. However, early radio receivers were not very selective and there were frequent disputes over interference between stations transmitting on nearby frequencies. Radio station WHN, on 830 kHz, complained that WRNY was now interfering with its signal, and labeled WRNY as a "pirate" broadcaster.

In 1927 the Federal Radio Commission (FRC) was established, with the authority to fully regulate broadcast station operations. A new frequency allocation that went into effect on June 15, 1927, assigned WRNY to 970 kHz, sharing this frequency with WPCH. Later in 1927 these two stations were reassigned to 920 kHz. Effective November 11, 1928, under the provisions of the FRC's General Order 40, WRNY was moved to 1010 kHz, sharing this assignment with three other New York City-area stations: WHN, WPAP and WQAO.

=== Bankruptcy ===
By 1927 the expenses exceeded the income of the Experimenter Publishing Company. The printer and paper supplier were each owed over $150,000. The radio station had advertising revenue but it did not cover large investment in the new transmitter facility in New Jersey and the television equipment. WRNY lost $42,000 in 1927 and $39,000 in 1928.

On February 20, 1929, an involuntary petition in bankruptcy was filed against the Experimenter Publishing Company. The total liabilities were estimated at $600,000 and assets at $182,000. A federal bankruptcy judge appointed the Irving Trust Company as receiver. Irving Trust kept the magazines and radio station operating but removed Hugo Gernsback and his brother Sidney from the company. The bankruptcy was not contested and the magazines and radio stations were sold. The bankruptcy proceedings were enthusiastically covered in the news and gossip columns of the New York City press.

The final bids were accepted at a hearing on April 3, 1929. Two publishers, Bernarr Macfadden and B. A. MacKinnon were the leading bidders. MacKinnon prevailed and paid $500,000 for the magazines. The radio stations were sold in a separate auction. Attorneys for newspaper publisher William R. Hearst and Curtiss Aircraft president C. M. Keys got into a bidding war for the radio stations. When the bid reached $100,000, a recess was called to allow one attorney to try to reach Hearst in California. He was unsuccessful and the Curtiss Aircraft bid won.

=== Aviation Radio ===
The day after the bankruptcy auction, the Aviation Radio Station, Inc. was formed to take over the WRNY radio stations. C. M. Keys, president of the Curtiss Aeroplane and Motor Company, provided the financial backing for the new company. Chester Cuthell, the attorney who was at the auction, was the president and Walter Lemmon was the general manager. The goal of the station was to promote aviation. The Federal Radio Commission had to approve station license transfer and any changes to the station. Mr. Cuthell asked the commission for more frequencies as he said that he and his partners had up to $2,000,000 to spend on the stations. The commission approved the license transfers and improvements to the existing stations.

In August 1929 Aviation Radio moved the studios from the Roosevelt Hotel to 27 West Fifty-Seventh Street. They also installed a new 1,000 watt transmitter with automatic frequency control and new speech amplifiers at the Coytesville transmitter site. These upgrades improved the station's range and sound quality. The short wave station, 2XAL, increased its power to 15,000 watts. The radio station's format was changed; the jazz music was prohibited and replaced with presentations devoted to aviation and aviators. On a show about women aviators, Amelia Earhart recounted her recent transcontinental flight. The station gave hourly weather reports of aviators. A typical schedule in late 1929 under the timesharing agreement on 1010 kHz had WRNY starting at 10:00 AM, WHN following at 1:30 PM, WPAP at 7:00 PM, and finally WRNY closing out the broadcast day from 9:30 PM to midnight. WQAO, owned by the Calvary Baptist Church, broadcast three programs on Sunday and one on Wednesday.

WRNY staff at control board and station bulletin board

=== Deletion ===
The owner of WHN, Metro-Goldwyn-Mayer, bought out WRNY and WQAO-WPAP in early 1933, which allowed WHN to begin fulltime operation on 1010 kHz. WRNY and WQAO-WPAP were formally deleted in January 1934.

== Shortwave transmissions ==
The early AM band radio transmitters used around New York City were typically 500 or 1,000 watts. To serve a larger area, beginning in the mid-1920s a few stations added a shortwave transmitter. In 1927, WRNY started experimental shortwave station 2XAL (later W2XAL) on 9.7 MHz. This 500–watt station could be heard throughout the world, and in September 1928 Hugo Gernsback wrote about a listener in New South Wales, Australia.

== Television broadcasts ==
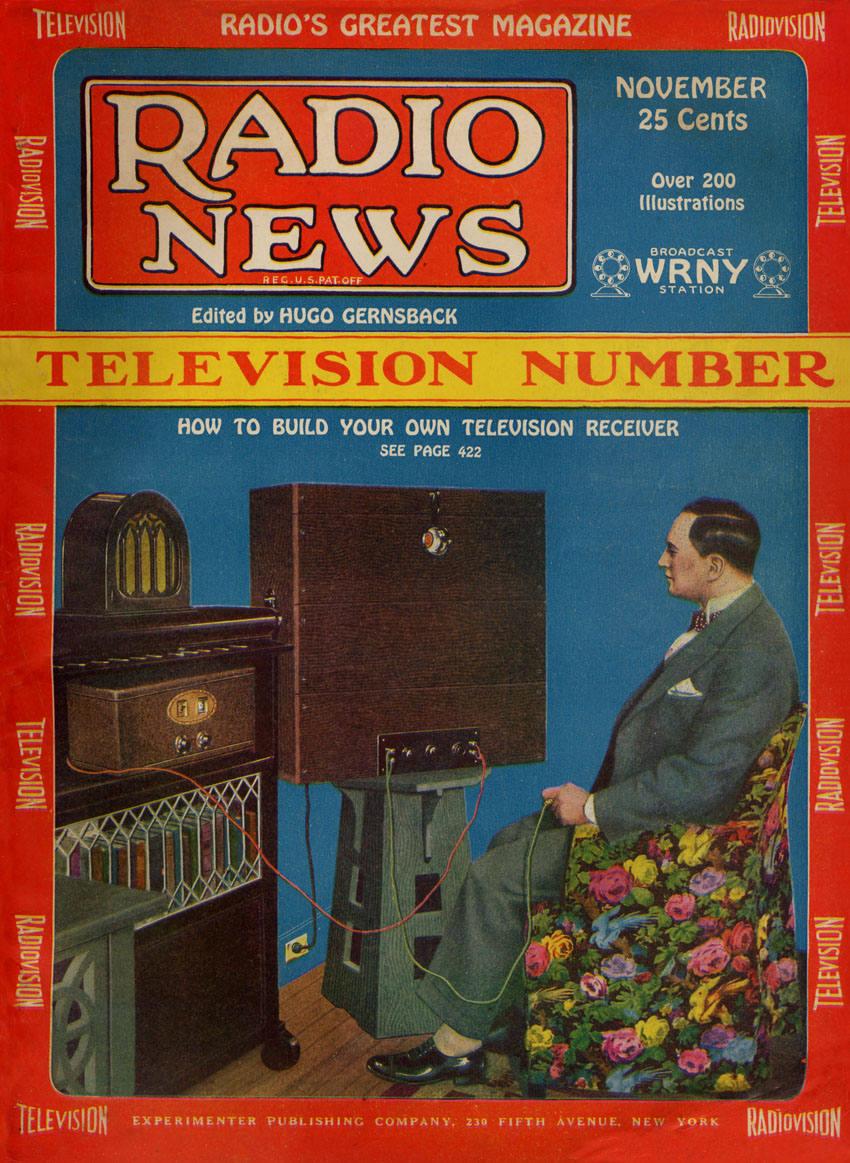
Hugo Gernsback watching WRNY television as shown on the cover of the November 1928 issue of Radio News.

Hugo Gernsback first wrote about television in the December 1909 issue of Modern Electrics and regularly reported technical advances in his magazines. By 1925 mechanical scanning television systems were becoming available, with resolutions of up to 60 scan lines. Vladimir K. Zworykin and Philo Farnsworth were developing electronic scanning systems that were the precursors of modern television but these would not be available for another decade.

WRNY was second to broadcast television pictures to the general public, after W3XK in Washington, D.C., and was preceded by several attempts to broadcast television pictures. In 1927 AT&T had demonstrated a system that sent television images and sound over telephone lines. The General Electric Research Laboratory in Schenectady, New York was sending experimental television over their shortwave radio station in early 1928. Westinghouse had a system that would broadcast motion pictures. Several other laboratories were also conducting experiments and demonstrations.

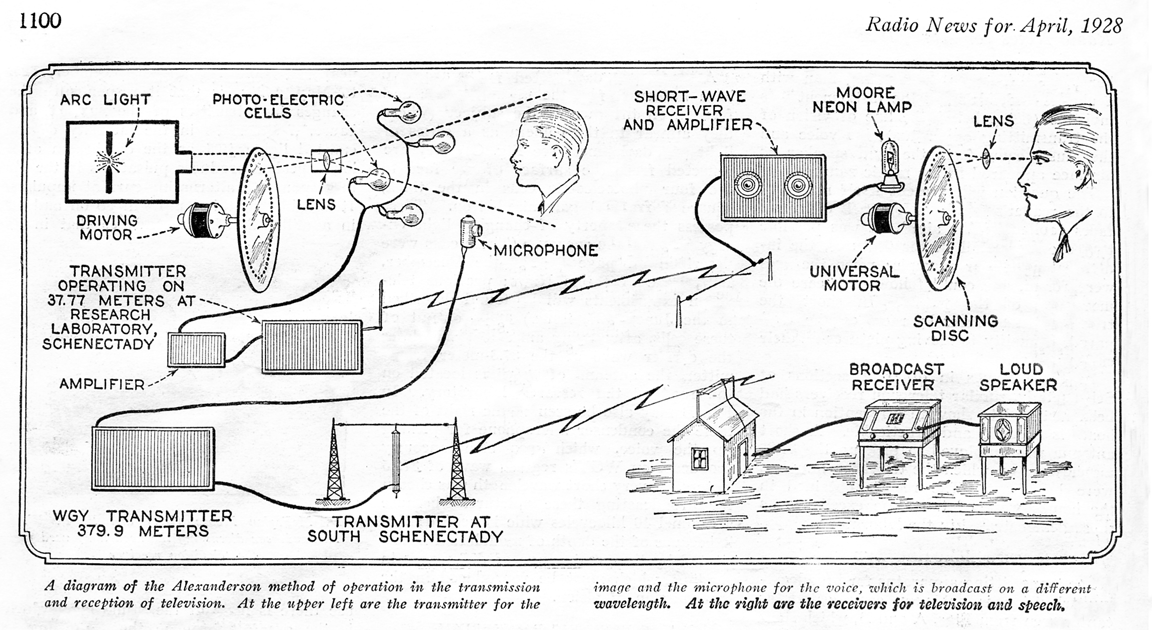
Block diagram of mechanical scan television system.

The television camera used a spinning disk, commonly known as a Nipkow disk, which had a spiral of holes used to sweep a narrow beam of light across the subject. The reflected light was picked up by a photoelectric cell whose electrical output would vary with the intensity of the light. This system was often called a "flying spot scanner". The early photoelectric cells were not very sensitive, so three or four would be used with the subject in a darkened booth. Another reason for multiple cells is even pickup of reflected light from the subject. The cell array includes cells in a window formation: One or more cells above, below and on each side of the subject.

The television receiver used the output of the photoelectric cell to control the brightness of a neon lamp. When the photoelectric cell detected a bright spot, the neon lamp's intensity was increased. The receiver also had a scanning disk with the same hole-pattern as the camera, and it spun at the same speed. The result was a small neon orange image (two inch (5 cm) diagonal) of the remote subject.

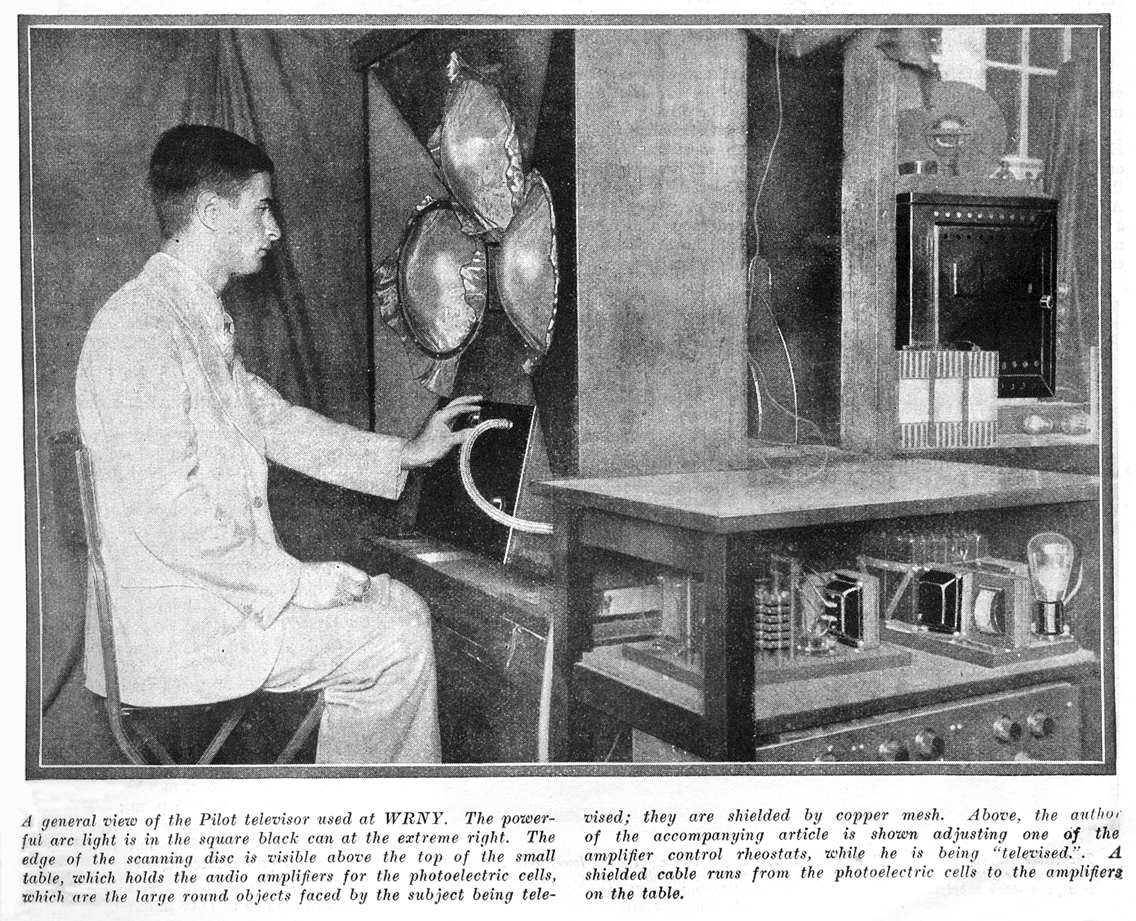
The Pilot "televisor" transmitter used at WRNY

In April 1928, Pilot Electric Manufacturing and WRNY announced that television broadcasts would begin that fall, with Pilot providing the transmitting equipment. Pilot sold receivers, and the Experimenter Publishing magazines provided complete plans to allowed readers to build their own. The system used by WRNY had 48 scan lines with 7.5 frames per second, with the received image was about 1.5 inches (3.8 cm) square. This low resolution picture, without sound, could be transmitted in the 5 kHz bandwidth of an AM radio station. The experimental stations on the shortwave bands could use a 15 kHz bandwidth for a higher quality image. When commercial television broadcasting began in the 1940s, television stations were allotted a 6 MHz bandwidth. High definition televisions commonly display resolution as 720p or 1080i; this early experimental television was a very low definition 48p display.

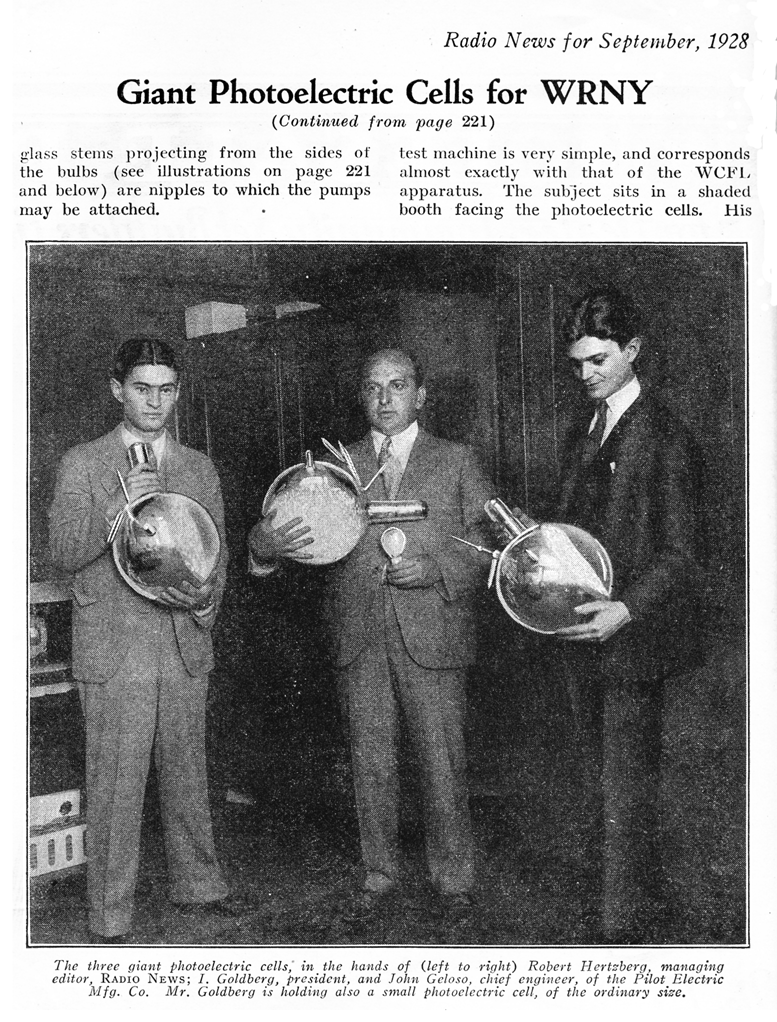
Giant photoelectric cells. Their cost was "rather staggering".

The television equipment WRNY used was designed by Pilot Electric's chief engineer, John Geloso. It was similar to the system designed by Uilses A. Sanabria that was used in a demonstration by WCFL in Chicago in June 1928. Both systems used photoelectric cells made by Lloyd Preston Garner; a researcher at the University of Illinois at Urbana–Champaign. A September 1928 Radio News article about these cells noted "their cost is rather staggering".

On August 12, 1928, the television equipment was moved from Pilot's Brooklyn laboratory to the WRNY transmitter house at Coytesville. A receiver was set up a quarter of a mile (400 m) away. The first subject televised was John Geloso's wife. The test ran from 5:43 to 6:30 PM with John Geloso and WRNY station engineer, John Maresca, also taking turns in front of the camera. A second test was conducted at 11 PM. The New York Times reported this successful test and said the regularly scheduled broadcast would start on August 13, although technical problems delayed this until August 21. The receiver was moved to Hugo Gernsback's Manhattan apartment on Riverside Drive about 5 miles (8 km) from the transmitter. At 10 PM on August 14, John Geloso turned on the set and viewed an image of his wife sitting before the camera in Coytesville. There were problems with synchronizing the spinning disk but a clear image could be seen for six or seven seconds at a time.

The "Today on the radio" section of the August 21, 1928, edition of The New York Times showed 9 television programs on the schedule for WRNY. That night, the first public demonstration of WRNY television was held in Philosophy Hall at New York University to an audience of radio engineers, scientist and newspaper reporters. About 500 people passed before the television to see the image of Mrs. Geloso: "Mrs. Geloso closed her eyes, opened and closed her mouth and moved side to side. The images were about one and one-half inches [3.8 cm] square, but were magnified by a lens to twice that size."

=== Homemade television receivers ===
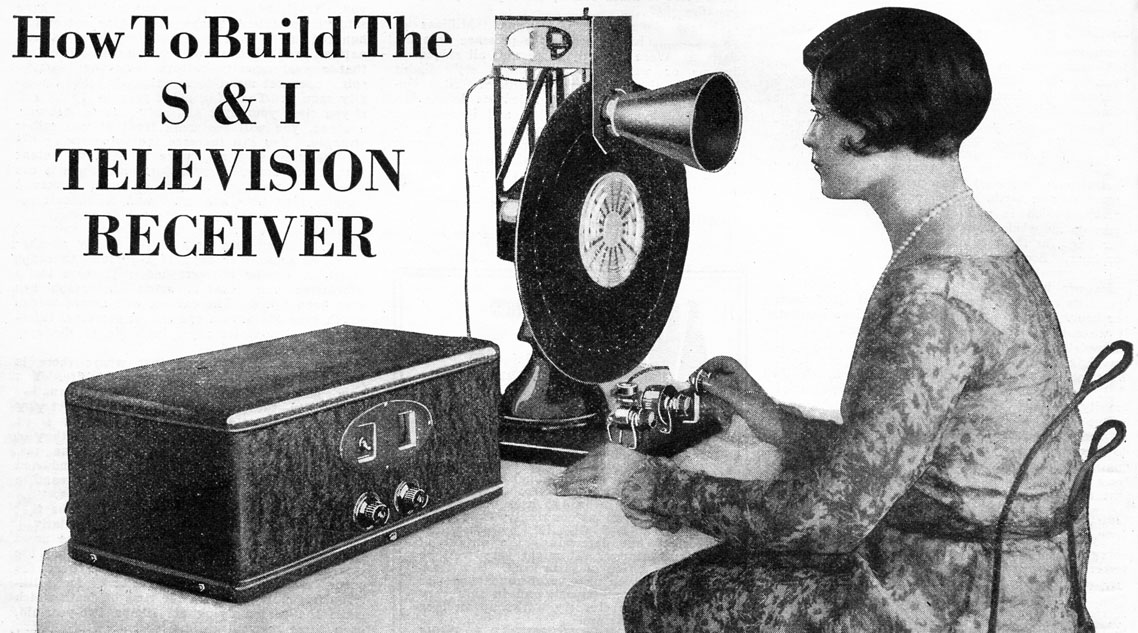
Complete television receiver connected to an ordinary radio

On July 4, 1928, The New York Times reported that in the past two weeks WRNY had received more than 2,000 letters requesting more information about the television broadcast. Hugo Gernsback stated: "The letters have come alike from radio listeners, wireless experimenters and home set builders who wish construction details about the apparatus required to intercept the television broadcast."

Television transmission using the shortwave bands could be received in New York City in early 1928, and Experimenter Publishing's magazines had been printing detailed descriptions of television receivers since 1927. The specialized parts to build a television were available that August. A New Jersey radio supply company, Daven, sold a complete television receiver kit for $100; the scanning disk was $10 and the neon bulb was $11.50. Raytheon advertised their "Kino-Lamp" and "Foto-Cell" for engineers and amateurs building televisions. The complexity of the television was typical of the construction projects published in Radio News every month so some experimenters had a set ready for the early August broadcast. The publication of detailed plans for the WRNY receiver in October would have increased the number of built sets. The exact number of home televisions in 1928 is unknown, with Hugo Gernsback estimating that the New York area had around 2000 receivers.

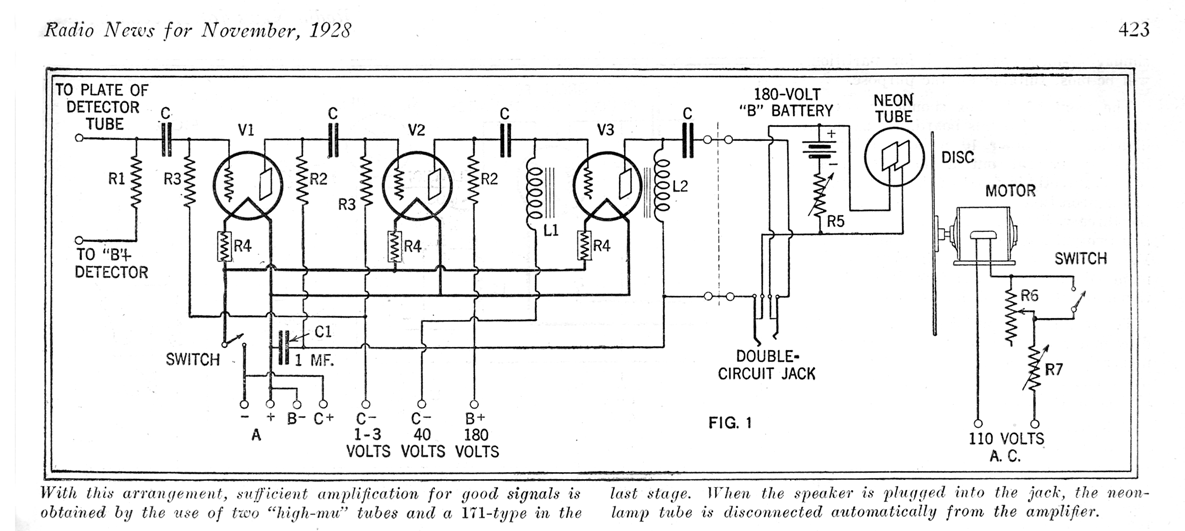
November 1928 WRNY television receiver schematic. The three vacuum tubes (V1, V2 and V3) amplified the radio output to drive the neon lamp.

The November 1928 issues (on the newsstand October 10) of Science and Invention and Radio News had detailed plans for building a receiver. However, Hugo Gernsback warned potential viewers that this early television receiver was for experimenters and "radio bugs", and not suitable for the general public.

The WRNY homemade television receiver consisted of a modified TRF radio receiver. This was an AM band receiver for WRNY transmissions, and a shortwave set for other television stations of the day. After the detector stage, the receiver required a three-tube television adapter, consisting of a resistance-coupled preamplifier and a power amplifier, with the power amplifier driving the neon lamp. A typical adapter had two preamplifier stages and one power amplifier stage. The adapter drove a neon lamp and a 24-inch (61 cm) Bakelite disk. The disk had 48 holes in a spiral pattern, with a neon bulb mounted behind the disk and replacing the radio loudspeaker.

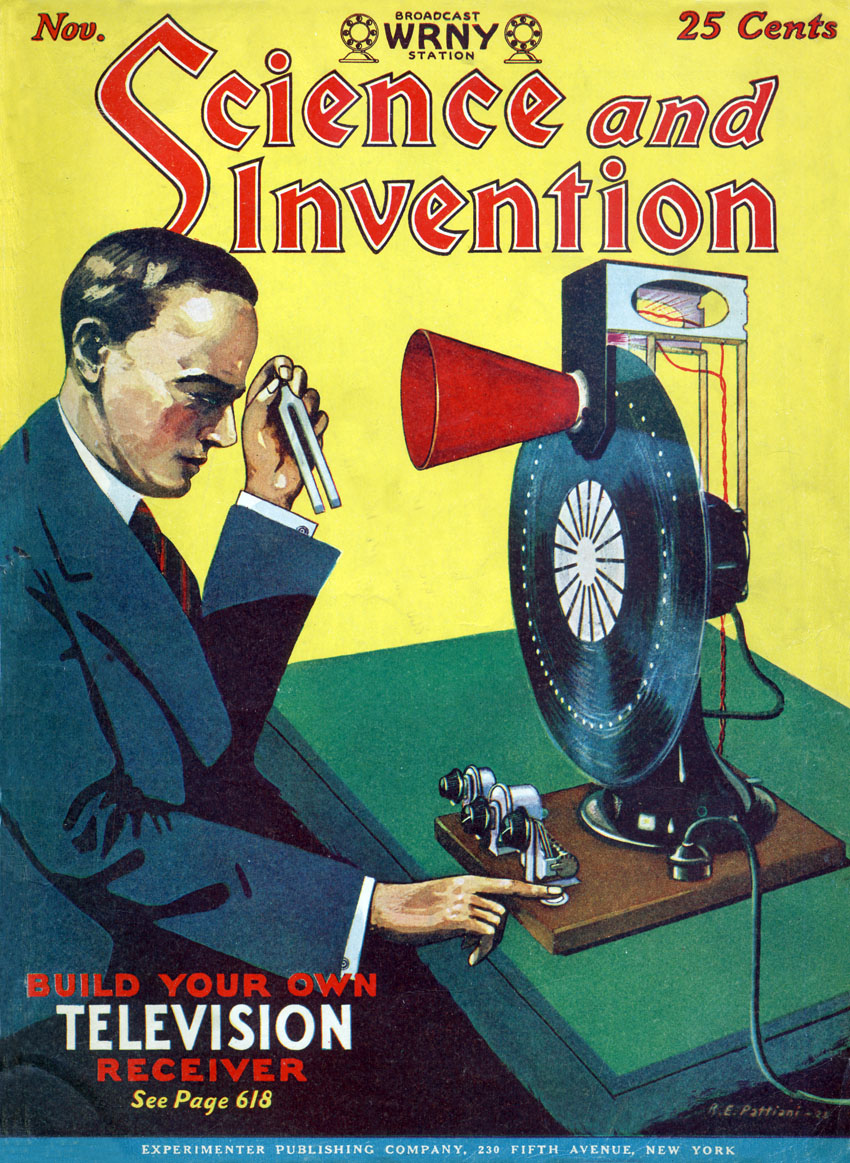
Using a tuning fork to synchronize a home made experimental television receiver (November 1928)

The cover illustration of the November 1928 issue of Science and Invention featured an experimenter operating one of the homemade television receivers, who was shown using a 125-hertz tuning fork to adjust the scanning wheel speed. Looking through the vibrating tuning fork, a stationary line pattern on the hub indicated when the wheel was spinning at 450 RPM. The proper speed is not the only requirement, as the receiver's disk must also match the angular position of the television station's scanner disk. (Most mechanical television stations used scanners instead of cameras to pick up the talent.) To make both disks align, the viewer pressed a button to adjust the receiving disk's speed.

With homemade sets, maintaining synchronization was a major concern. A receiver with a fan ("universal") motor required the viewer to manually synchronize picture reception. The scanner at the television studio used a synchronous motor. With the same type synchronous motor, the receiver is far easier to keep in step, which is made much easier if both the studio scanner and the home are running off power from the same AC power grid, for with synchronous motors on the same grid, receiver sync is automatic, and the user must then only frame the picture. The variable resistors (R6 and R7 in the construction schematic) controlled the motor speed. The switch boosted the speed of the disk to synchronize it with the camera. To achieve 7.5 image frames per second, the receiver's disk, being rotated by standard household fan motor, needed to spin at 450 rpm. An external, variable resistor controlled the motor speed.

The Federal Radio Commission was concerned about television broadcasts on the AM radio band, and the possible interference with standard audio broadcasts. On November 2, 1928, the FRC limited television broadcast to shortwave stations above 1500 kHz. The broadcast would be limited to a 10 kHz bandwidth and for periods of not more than one hour per day. They were not allowed between 6 PM and 11 PM. The commission would review television broadcasting in January 1929.

== See also ==
- November 1928 Radio News article on first TV broadcast
- List of experimental television stations
- Mechanical television
- History of television

== Notes ==
- In the 1920s, a listing of broadcast stations in a magazine or newspaper would use wavelength instead of frequency to specify a station's location on the radio dial. The advertising logo for WRNY shows both, 326 meters and 920 kilocycles. The public was slow to adopt the new "kilocycle" terminology because they could relate to wavelengths. A radio station's antenna was a one-half wavelength long wire between two masts. The unit kilocycle (kc.) was replaced by kilohertz (kHz) in the 1960s.
