= Charles Jenkins Laboratories =

Commercial television station

Charles Jenkins Laboratories was founded in by Charles Francis Jenkins, developer of the Phantoscope, the first commercial TV station W3XK and the first commercial television company.

== History ==
Charles Francis Jenkins in 1890 moved to Washington, D.C., to work as a stenographer, then he experimented with motion pictures and in 1890 developed a movie projector called the Phantoscope, the laboratory was created years after it.

== Transmission of Pictures over Wireless ==
On March 13, 1922, Charles Jenkins filed the U.S. patent No. 1,544,156 for Transmission of Pictures over Wireless, it was granted on June 30, 1925.

== W3XK, the first commercial TV station in the US ==
In 1928 Charles Jenkins was granted the first commercial television license in the United States and On July 2, 1928, Jenkins Television Corporation started to operate W3XK, the first TV station. first aired from Jenkins Labs in Washington and from 1929 on from Wheaton, Maryland, five nights a week. At first, the station could only send silhouette images due to its narrow bandwidth, but that was soon rectified and real black-and-white images were transmitted.

== Jenkins Television Corporation ==
In December 1928, Charles Jenkins founded in New Jersey the Jenkins Television Corporation to produce and manufacture Radiovisors. In March 1932, Jenkins Television Corporation was liquidated and its assets acquired by Lee de Forest Radio Corporation. Within months, the De Forest company went bankrupt and the assets were bought by RCA stopping all work on electromechanical television.

== W2XCR ==
The Laboratories also operated experimental station W2XCR, it operated a Jenkins mechanical scanner through the experimental transmitter, W2XCR. The station broadcast using both 48-line, 15 frame/s, and 60-line, 20 frame/s standards during 1931.

== Closure ==
Charles Jenkins Laboratories closed after Mr. Jenkins died in 1934.

== See also ==
- W3XK
- W2XCR
- Charles Francis Jenkins
