= SS C. Francis Jenkins =

World War II Liberty ship of the United States

History

United States
- Name: C. Francis Jenkins
- Namesake: C. Francis Jenkins
- Owner: War Shipping Administration (WSA)
- Operator: Agwilines Inc.
- Ordered: as type (EC2-S-C1) hull, MC hull 2316
- Builder: J.A. Jones Construction, Panama City, Florida
- Cost: $975,633
- Yard number: 57
- Way number: 2
- Laid down: 20 July 1944
- Launched: 26 August 1944
- Sponsored by: Mrs.E.S.Gladys Morgan
- Completed: 9 September 1944
- Identification: Call sign: WSYJ
- Fate: Sold for commercial use, 16 December 1946, withdrawn from fleet, 12 January 1947

Panama
- Name: Ionian Leader
- Owner: Compania de Navegacion Cristobal de Panama
- Fate: Scrapped, 1966

General characteristics
- Class & type: Liberty ship; type EC2-S-C1, standard
- Tonnage: 10,865 LT DWT; 7,176 GRT
- Displacement: 3,380 long tons (3,434 t) (light); 14,245 long tons (14,474 t) (max)
- Length: 441 feet 6 inches (135 m) oa; 416 feet (127 m) pp; 427 feet (130 m) lwl
- Beam: 57 feet (17 m)
- Draft: 27 ft 9.25 in (8.4646 m)
- Installed power: 2 × Oil fired 450 °F (232 °C) boilers, operating at 220 psi (1,500 kPa); 2,500 hp (1,900 kW)
- Propulsion: 1 × triple-expansion steam engine, (manufactured by Filer and Stowell, Milwaukee, Wisconsin); 1 × screw propeller
- Speed: 11.5 knots (21.3 km/h; 13.2 mph)
- Capacity: 562,608 cubic feet (15,931 m^{3}) (grain); 499,573 cubic feet (14,146 m^{3}) (bale)
- Complement: 38–62 USMM; 21–40 USNAG
- Armament: Varied by ship; Bow-mounted 3-inch (76 mm)/50-caliber gun; Stern-mounted 4-inch (102 mm)/50-caliber gun; 2–8 × single 20-millimeter (0.79 in) Oerlikon anti-aircraft (AA) cannons and/or, 2–8 × 37-millimeter (1.46 in) M1 AA guns

SS C. Francis Jenkins was a Liberty ship built in the United States during World War II. She was named after C. Francis Jenkins, a pioneer of early cinema and television.

== Construction ==
C. Francis Jenkins was laid down on 20 July 1944, under a Maritime Commission (MARCOM) contract, MC hull 2316, by J.A. Jones Construction, Panama City, Florida; sponsored by Mrs. E. S. Gladys Morgan, wife of resident MARCOM auditor; and launched on 26 August 1944.

== History ==
She was allocated to Agwilines Inc., 9 September 1944. On 22 May 1946, she was laid up in the National Defense Reserve Fleet, Hudson River Reserve Fleet, Jones Point, New York.

Allocated to A. L. Burbank and Co., LTD, 16 July 1946. Placed in National Defense Reserve Fleet, Mobile, Alabama, 2 December 1946.

She was sold, on 16 December 1946, to Cia de Nav. Cristobal, for commercial use, and renamed Ionian Leader. She was withdrawn from the fleet on 12 January 1947.

== Bibliography ==
- "Jones Construction, Panama City FL". www.ShipbuildingHistory.com. 13 October 2010.
- Maritime Administration. "C. Francis Jenkins". Ship History Database Vessel Status Card. U.S. Department of Transportation, Maritime Administration. This article incorporates text from this source, which is in the public domain.
- Davies, James (May 2004). "Specifications (As-Built)" (PDF). p. 23.
- "SS C. Francis Jenkins".
