= W1WX =

Television station in Boston, Massachusetts

W1XAV Boston
Programming
- Language: English

Ownership
- Owner: Shortwave and Television Laboratory, Inc.

History
- Founded: April 1929 (as W1WX)
- First air date: January 1930
- Last air date: June 27, 1934
- Former names: W1WX

Technical information
- Licensing authority: FRC
- Class: Experimental
- ERP: 500 watts

W1WX is Boston's second former television station (the first being W1XAY). This station started up in April 1929, and was owned by Shortwave and Television Laboratory, Inc., (which was founded on December 5, 1928 by A.M. "Vic" Morgan, Hollis Baird, and Butler Perry).

The station started broadcasting on 2.12 MHz, alternating between 48 and 60 vertical lines and 15 frames per second. In 1930, it moved over to 2.1-2.2 MHz and broadcast at 48 lines only, still at 15 frames per second.

In 1934, the station switched back to 60 vertical lines only, running at 20 frames per second until it shut down.

== Timeline ==
- April 1929: Station is founded as W1WX by Shortwave and Television, broadcasting two times a day at 100 watts power, until December.
- September 30, 1929: W1XAV Boston is listed in the Radio Service Bulletin at 2.1-2.2 MHz, with 500 watts of power.
- December 1929: station call-sign is changed to W1XAV.
- January 1930: W1XAV Boston officially goes on air.
- late March 1930: W1XAY (Lexington, Massachusetts), leaving W1XAV temporarily as the only mechanical TV station in Boston.
- December 7, 1930: W1XAV Boston broadcasts a video portion of a CBS Radio program, The Fox Trappers orchestra program, sponsored by I. J. Fox Furriers. Included was what is sometimes called the first television commercial, which was prohibited by FRC regulations, however, other experimental television stations such as W1XAY may have done so before W1XAV signed on the air. Regardless, the FRC advised against this, since there was no agreement on whether experimental stations could air commercials, or sponsored network programming.
- March 8, 1934: Baird, Perry, and Morgan had all moved to General Television Corp, which they acquire the same day.
- June 27, 1934: W1XAV goes off the air. The FCC told Shortwave and Television Laboratory that two mechanical TV stations were not needed. One license was accepted, the other was denied, effective July 13, 1934. By now, Shortwave and Television changed its name to General Television Corporation. and switched from a mechanical to an electronic system.
- January 1, 1935: General Television Corp is officially dissolved.

== See also ==
- Oldest television station
- List of experimental television stations
