= W1XAY =

Television station in Lexington, Massachusetts

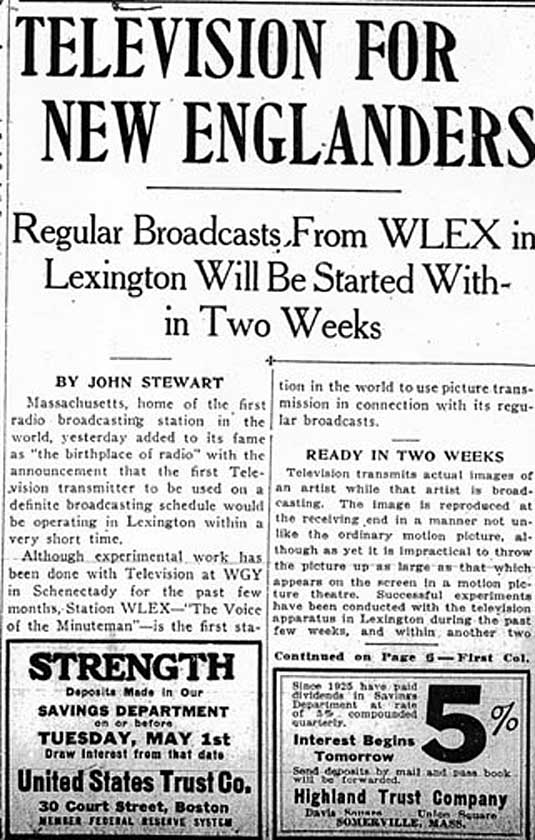
The Boston Post May 4, 1928

W1XAY was one of the first television stations in the United States. It debuted on June 14, 1928. At that time, it was the sister station of "WLEX" in Lexington, Massachusetts, United States (near Boston), the current day WVEI in Worcester.

The television station broadcast on a wavelength of 85.7 meters (3.5 MHz), with 48 vertical lines of resolution, and 18 frames per second. It shut down in March 1930.

The station was owned by the Boston Post, which also owned WLEX.

The WLEX call letters now reside with WLEX-TV, the NBC television network affiliate in Lexington, Kentucky.

== See also ==
- List of experimental television stations
- W1XAV
