= W5XA =

Former experimental television station

W5XA OR W9XX was an experimental television station broadcast in Shreveport, Louisiana from 1929 to 1934.

== History ==
W5XA originally began as W9XX and began broadcasting on 1604 kHz with 100 watts power as a radio station. In September 1930, it was licensed to Rev. Lannie W. Stewart, in Carterville, Missouri. In October 1931, the station was apparently sold to Paul L. Carriger, and moved to Shreveport. The next month the frequency was changed to 1594 kHz, and a number of shortwave frequencies were authorized. The call sign was changed to W5XA. The station officially went on the air on January 11, 1932, with both audio and video transmissions. The audio was transmitted on 1594 kHz and the video on the 160 meter amateur radio band.

Newspaper accounts, and the recollection of W. E. Antony, a radio pioneer who was involved in the station, say that TV broadcasting started in 1929. The equipment shown below dates from 1932, so another camera must have been used, probably a home made one.

The call-sign for the television station was listed in newspapers as W9XX, however, it is likely that the confusion came from a photo of a station a microphone, purchased as part of the station in Carterville, with W9XX on it. Paul L. Carriger gave up on TV in 1934 as money and interest had become scarce during The Great Depression.

The station broadcast with 45 horizontal scanning lines, and 15 frames per second.
