= W6XAH =

Experimental TV station

W6XAH was an experimental television station that broadcast in Bakersfield, California, starting on January 6, 1932, and continuing until 1935.

W6XAH was operated by Frank Schamblin, Leo Schamblin and Charles Schamblin of the Pioneer Mercantile Company, which also started the first radio station in Bakersfield in 1933, KPMC, operating on 1560 kHz. Lee de Forest was involved in the television station, and a nearly lifesize picture of him was on the wall at KPMC.

The station made its first broadcast on January 6, 1932. According to Leo Schamblin's son (also named Leo), a receiver was installed in the showroom of the Pioneer Mercantile hardware store in Taft, California, about 40 miles away. People from the town came to watch the first transmission, which was of the Walt Disney cartoon Steamboat Willie. The following day, Leo received a phone call from Walt Disney, who inquired as to how the transmission went. Leo told him that everything went well, and Walt replied that he had been following the progress of W6XAH, but unfortunately Disney was going to file suit against the station for use of the cartoon. Leo was astounded, but Walt then told Leo that the damages that Disney would demand would be $25, and that Disney would send Leo a check for that amount. Walt explained that Disney had to protect its copyright position with the new medium of television.

Apparently the station stopped broadcasting a regular schedule later that year, but continued to experiment with television until 1935. FCC records show the station licensed for the 2000–2100 kHz band in 1935. During 1932, the audio portion of the TV transmissions was apparently broadcast on 1550 kHz.
