= Charles Francis Jenkins =

American cinema pioneer (1867–1934)

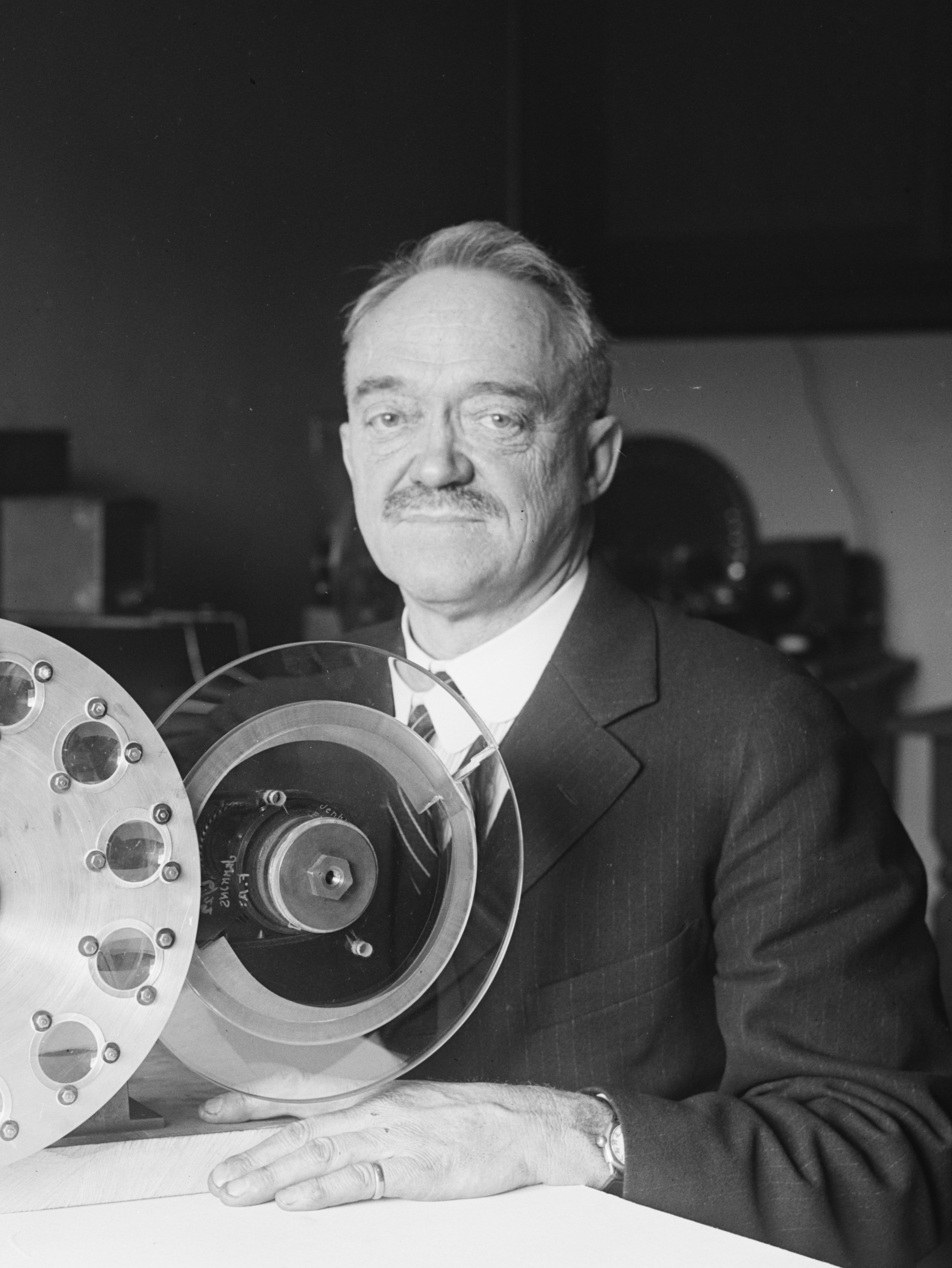
- Charles Francis Jenkins in 1925
- Born: August 22, 1867; Dayton, Ohio, U.S.
- Died: June 6, 1934 (aged 66); Washington, D.C., U.S.
- Resting place: Rock Creek Cemetery; Washington, D.C., U.S.
- Education: Bliss Electrical School
- Engineering career
- Projects: Over 400 patents related to a variety of inventions
- Significant advance: Motion picture projector and television
- Awards: Elliott Cresson Medal (1897); John Scott Medal (1913)

Charles Francis Jenkins (August 22, 1867 – June 6, 1934) was an American engineer who was a pioneer of early cinema and one of the inventors of television, though he used mechanical rather than electronic technologies. His businesses included Charles Jenkins Laboratories and Jenkins Television Corporation (the corporation being founded in 1928, the year the Laboratories were granted the first commercial television license in the United States). Over 400 patents were issued to Jenkins, many for his inventions related to motion pictures and television.

Jenkins was born in Dayton, Ohio, grew up near Richmond, Indiana, where he went to school and went to Washington, D.C. in 1890, where he worked as a stenographer.

== Motion pictures ==
Jenkins started experimenting with motion pictures in 1891, and eventually quit his job and concentrated fully on the development of his own movie projector, the Phantoscope.

Homer Croy described in his 1918 book How Motion Pictures Are Made, that the Richmond Telegram reported on June 6, 1894, about his endeavors to show his parents, friends, and newsmen a gadget he had been working on for two years: a "motion picture projecting box". They gathered at Jenkins' cousin's jewelry store in downtown Richmond and viewed a live-action film screening in front of an audience. The motion picture was of vaudeville dancer Annabelle doing a butterfly dance, which Jenkins had filmed himself in the backyard of his Washington boarding house. According to later accounts, each film frame was painstakingly colored by hand. This 1894 event has not been confirmed, and may instead represent a similar demonstration in 1895.

A July 1894 article in the Photographic Times noted how the Phantoscope had several advantages over Edison's Kinetograph; it was small (5 x 5 x 8 inches), portable and cheap. Although Jenkins had written that he intended to make a nickel-in-the-slot device (comparable to Anschütz's Electrotachyscope and the Kinetoscope), the machine could project its images "upon any size screen" with a magic lantern (comparable to the Zoopraxiscope that Muybridge used to project traced contours of his chronophotographic pictures). The magazine published a selection of 15 circular frames of the 50 frames movie of a man putting a shot. Jenkins also planned to synchronize the movies to sound recordings with a phonograph (as previously suggested by Wordsworth Donisthorpe, Muybridge and others since very soon after the introduction of Edison's device in 1877).

At the Bliss Electrical School, in Washington, D.C., Jenkins met his classmate Thomas Armat, and together they improved the design. They did a public screening at Cotton States and International Exposition in Atlanta in 1895 and subsequently broke up quarreling over patent issues. This modified Phantoscope of Jenkins and Armat was patented July 20, 1897. Jenkins eventually sold his interest in the projector to Armat. Armat subsequently sold the rights to Thomas Edison, who marketed the projector under the name Vitascope. It was with this projector that Edison began public showings in vaudeville theaters of filmed motion pictures, with paid admission.

In 1898, Jenkins published Animated Pictures, an early overview of the historical development and explanations of the methods and machines.

== Television ==
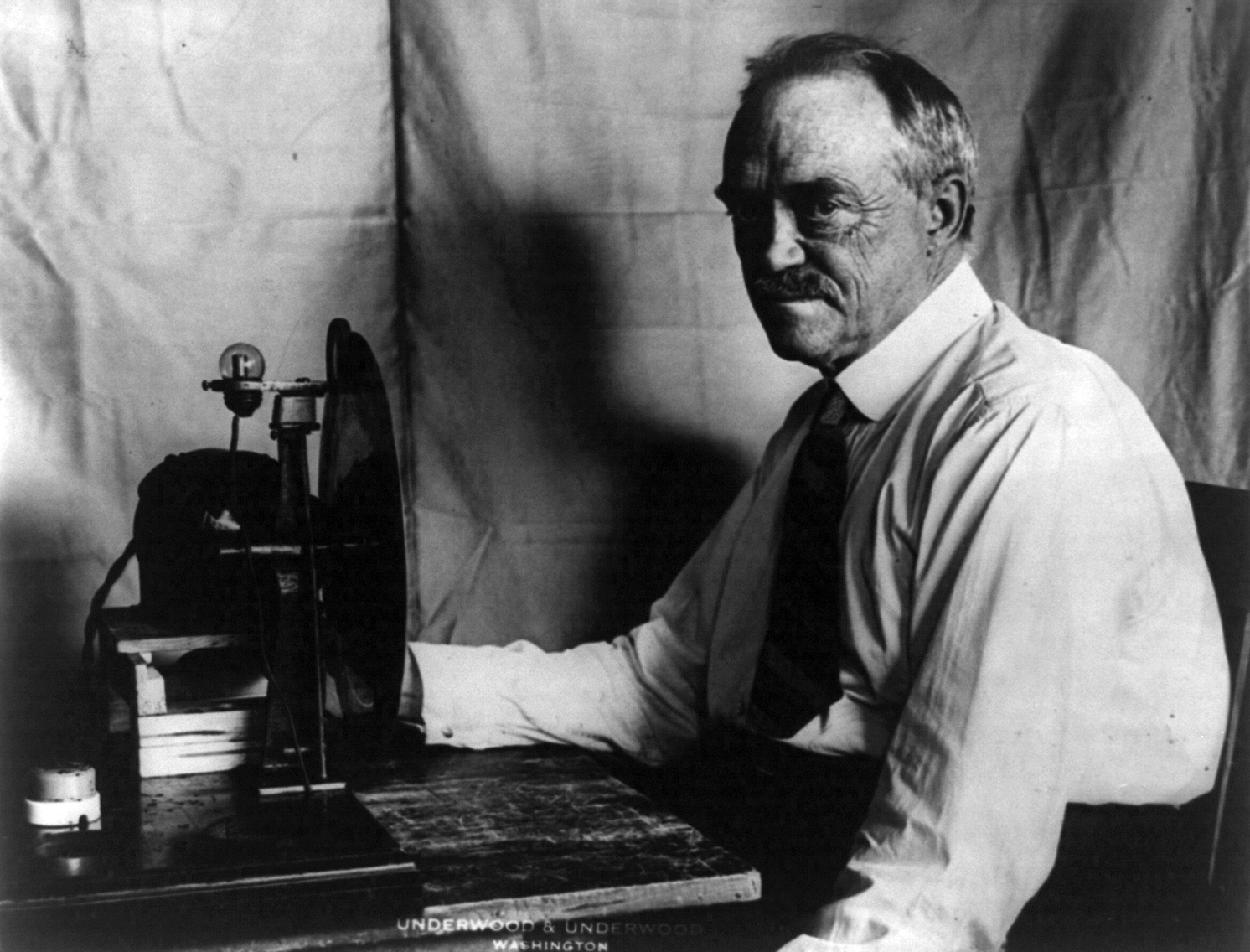
July 1928

Charles Jenkins claimed to have broadcast the world's first wireless motion pictures. On June 13, 1925, an exhibition was arranged for government officials. To demonstrate motion, a small model of a Dutch windmill was constructed, and its blades were turned slowly by the wind generated from an electric fan. With the cooperation of the U.S. Navy, this moving image was broadcast from the Naval Radio Station in Bellevue, Washington, D.C., and received by Jenkins' rooftop antenna at 1519 Connecticut Avenue several miles distant where the images were projected for the public. Charles Jenkins was awarded the U.S. patent "Transmitting Pictures by Wireless" on June 30, 1925.

In 1928, the Jenkins Television Corporation opened the first television broadcasting station in the U.S., named W3XK, which went on air on July 2 from the Jenkins Laboratories at 1519 Connecticut Avenue in Washington D.C., eventually broadcasting six nights a week at 8pm. At first, the station could only send silhouette images due to its narrow bandwidth, but that was soon rectified and real black-and-white images were transmitted. The Jenkins Television Corporation went public in December 1928 and gained a market value of $10 million. From 1929 the broadcasts were sent from Wheaton, Maryland.

His mechanical technologies (also pioneered by John Logie Baird) were later overtaken by electronic television such as devised by Vladimir Zworykin and Philo Farnsworth. In March 1932, Jenkins Television Corporation was liquidated and its assets acquired by Lee de Forest Radio Corporation. Within months, the De Forest company went bankrupt and the assets were bought by RCA stopping all work on electromechanical television.

== Other endeavors and personal life ==
Jenkins also dabbled in automobiles with Jenkins Automobile Company. In 1898, he invented the first automobile with an engine in the front of the car. In 1901 he constructed the smallest car for the 26-inch tall Cuban performer Chiquita. Jenkins married Grace Love in 1902.

== Bibliography ==
In 1898, Charles Francis Jenkins published Animated pictures, its copyright has expired, and it is currently in the public domain.

== Achievements, awards ==
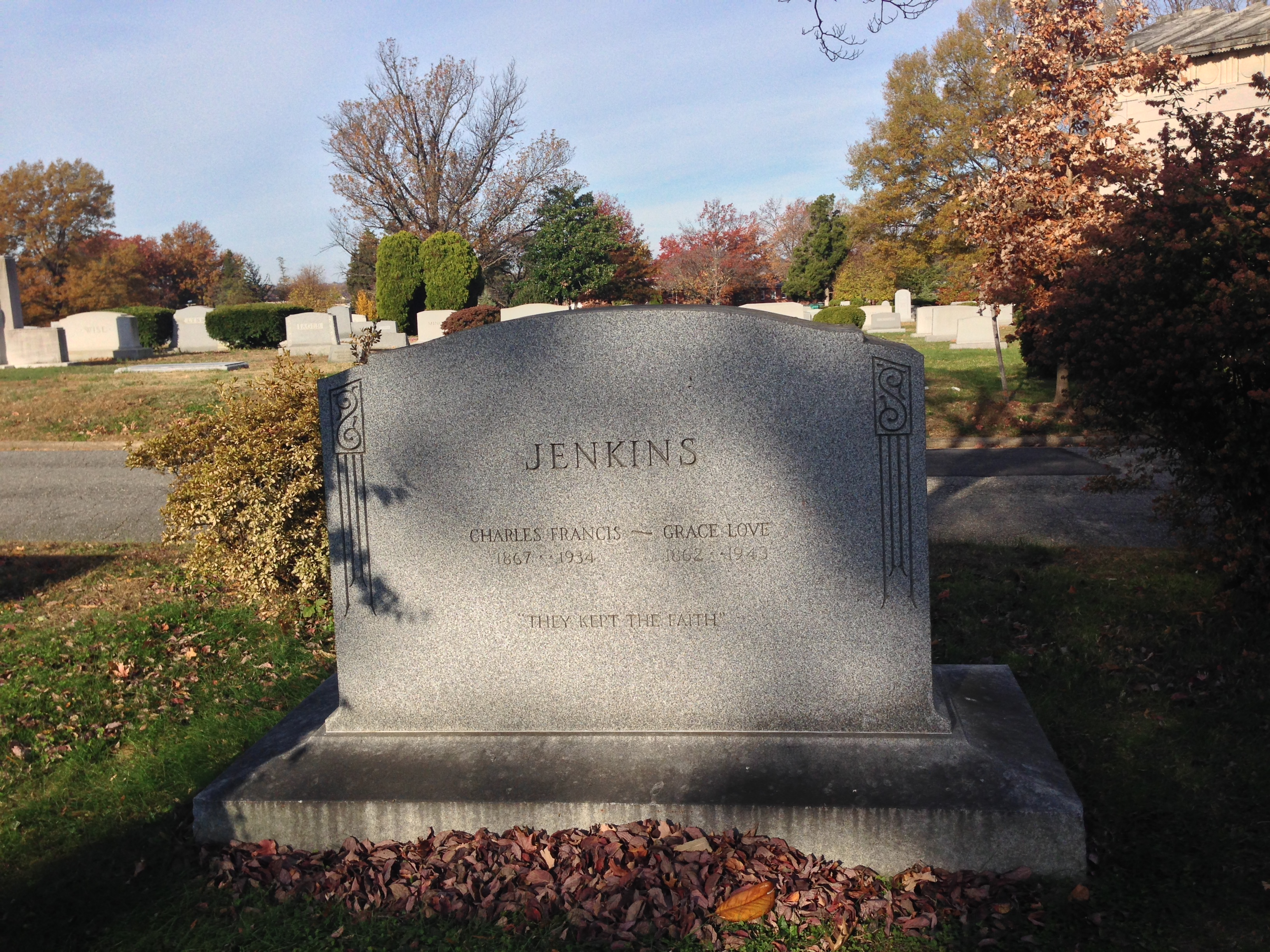
Jenkins' tombstone at Rock Creek Cemetery, Washington D.C.

Jenkins was awarded the prestigious Elliott Cresson Gold Medal for scientific achievement in 1897 and the Scott Medal in 1913 by the Franklin Institute & Science Museum-Philadelphia. He was the founder and first president of the Society of Motion Picture Engineers (now includes television, SMPTE).

Jenkins wrote several books including Vision By Radio, Radio Photographs, Radio Photograms and The Boyhood of an Inventor, as well as many articles that focused on his inventions, which were published in a variety of national magazines.

He received an honorary doctor of science degree from Earlham College, Richmond, Indiana, his alma mater, in June 1929.

The Academy of Television Arts & Sciences, best known for the annual Emmy Awards, commemorates the contributions of Jenkins to the television industry by naming one of the academy's most prestigious awards after him: the Charles F. Jenkins Lifetime Achievement Award is a special engineering honor to an individual whose contributions over time have significantly affected the state of television technology and engineering.

Jenkins was inducted into the National Inventors Hall of Fame in 2011.

Charles Francis Jenkins died at age 66 in Washington, D.C. He is interred in Rock Creek Cemetery.

The World War II Liberty Ship SS C. Francis Jenkins was named in his honor.

== See also ==
- Charles Jenkins Laboratories
- W3XK
