= Thomas Armat =

American mechanic and inventor (1866–1948)

Thomas J. Armat
- Born: October 25, 1866; Fredericksburg, Virginia, U.S.
- Died: September 30, 1948 (aged 81); Washington, D.C., U.S.
- Known for: Vitascope

Thomas J. Armat (October 25, 1866 – September 30, 1948) was an American mechanic and inventor, a pioneer of cinema best known through the co-invention of the Edison Vita.

== Education ==
Armat studied at the Mechanics Institute in Richmond, Virginia and then in 1894 at the Bliss Electrical School in Washington, D.C., where he met Charles Francis Jenkins. The two classmates teamed up to develop a movie projector using a new kind of intermittent motion mechanism, a "beater mechanism" similar to the one patented 1893 by Georges Demenÿ in France. It was one of the first projectors using what is known as the Latham loop (an extra loop of the film before the transport mechanism to reduce the tension on the film and avoid film breakage, developed independently at the same time by Woodville Latham and his sons). They made their first public projection using their invention, named Phantoscope after an earlier model designed by Jenkins alone, in September 1895 at the Cotton States and International Exposition in Atlanta.

== Controversy ==
Following this success, the two co-inventors broke up over patent issues. Jenkins tried to claim sole inventorship, but was turned down and sold out to Armat, who subsequently joined and sold the patent to Thomas Edison, who marketed the machine as the 'Vitascope'. The projector was used in a public screening in New York City beginning April 23, 1896 and lasting more than a week.

Working for Edison, Armat refined the projector in 1897 by replacing the beater mechanism with a more precise Geneva drive, duplicating an invention made a year earlier in Germany by Oskar Messter and Max Griewe and in England by Robert William Paul.

In 1947, Armat and William Nicholas Selig, Albert E. Smith and George Kirke Spoor were awarded a Special Academy Award as representatives of the movie pioneers for their contributions to the film business.

He died on September 30, 1948.

In 2011, he was inducted, posthumously, into the National Inventors Hall of Fame.
