= Phantoscope =

Charles Francis Jenkins film projection system

Image of the Phantoscope from Scientific American 1896

The Phantoscope was a film projection machine, a creation of Charles Francis Jenkins and Thomas Armat. In the early 1890s, Jenkins began creating the projector. He later met Thomas Armat, who provided financial backing and assisted with necessary modifications.

On September 25, 1895, Jenkins and Armat began the presentation of their completed Phantoscopes at the Cotton States Exposition in Atlanta, Georgia. Their presentation continued for the next eighteen days, during which the increased strain causes conflicts. Tensions escalated when, on October 13, Jenkins borrowed one of their three completed Phantoscopes. He intended to present the invention in his hometown of Indiana, and promised to return the machine by October 25. He did not, and instead, remained in Indiana.

Armat decided to leave the exhibit with their remaining Phantoscope, after a fire destroyed several exhibits and another of their Phantoscopes. What followed was a lengthy court battle in which Jenkins sought a solo patent, but was denied, resulting in Jenkins receiving a solo patent for his initial projector and Armat for the modified version. After the issue was settled, Armat sold his patent to Thomas Alva Edison.

Writer Homer Croy described in his 1918 book How Motion Pictures Are Made, how Charles Francis Jenkins would have presented the first motion picture on a large screen on 6 June 1894 in Richmond, Indiana, with his parents, brothers, other family members, friends and some newspaper men as an audience. Jenkins would have shot the presented film of Annabelle's butterfly dance in the backyard of his Washington home and had each frame colorized. When film historian Terry Ramsaye investigated this event for his 1926 book A Million and One Nights, Annabelle replied to questions about the film that it had been a great pleasure to go to Edison's Black Maria studio where she performed her "Butterfly", "Serpentine' and "Sun" dances, but that she had never danced for Jenkins. The newspaper article that Croy cited could not be found, not even in Jenkins' scrapbook where Croy claimed to have gotten his information from. The scrapbook did however contain a picture of the "first successful projecting Phantoscope (...) — built in January 1895)". After much more research, it seemed that the first successful Phantoscope projection had been the September 1895 screening in collaboration with Thomas Armat, who seems to have been the one to come up with the crucial idea of intermittent film transport. A screening in Jenkins' cousin's jewelry store, rather similar to Croy's description, took place in October 1895.

Jenkins continued improving the projector and created motion picture cameras that were eventually used for broadcasting to home receivers by radio waves, or what we know today as, television. Mechanically he broadcast the first television pictures and owned the first commercially licensed television station in the United States.

The Franklin Institute later awarded a gold medal to Jenkins for his invention as the world's first practical movie projector.
