= W3XK =

Television station in Wheaton, Maryland (1928–1934)

W3XK is widely regarded as the oldest television station in the United States. It was operated by Charles Jenkins of Charles Jenkins Laboratories from July 2, 1928 to 1934. It is believed to be the first station to broadcast to the general public. (Note, however, that in January 1928, GE began broadcasting as 2XB – later W2XB – on 790 kHz using a 24 line mechanical standard.) The station's frequency started out at 1605 kc., but moved to 6420 kc. (6.42 Mc.), and eventually moved to the 2.-2.1 Mc. band. It broadcast from Jenkins Laboratories at 1519 Connecticut Avenue, NW Washington, D.C., at a resolution of just 48 lines. The way to view television at the time was by mechanical television sets, and this station operated in that way.

== See also ==
- W2XB
