= Corner reflector antenna =

Type of directional antenna

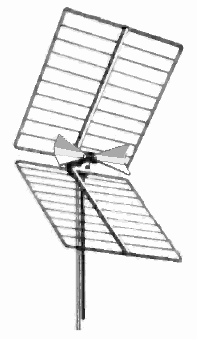
Corner reflector UHF TV antenna from 1954 with bowtie dipole driven element

A corner reflector antenna is a type of directional antenna used at VHF and UHF frequencies. It was invented by John D. Kraus in 1938. It consists of a dipole driven element mounted in front of two flat rectangular reflecting screens joined at an angle, usually 90°. Corner reflector antennas have moderate gain of 10–15 dB, high front-to-back ratio of 20–30 dB, and wide bandwidth.

Corner reflector antennas are widely used for UHF television receiving antennas, point-to-point communication links and data links for wireless WANs, and amateur radio antennas on the 144, 420, and 1296 MHz bands. They radiate linearly polarized radio waves and can be mounted for either horizontal or vertical polarization.

The corner reflector antenna should not be confused with a corner reflector, a passive device used to reflect radio waves back toward the source.

== Physical design ==
Construction of a typical corner reflector antenna

The flat reflecting surfaces can be metal sheets, but are more often made of wire screen or rod elements parallel to the driven element, to reduce weight and wind loads on the antenna. The spacing of the rods D should not be more than 0.06 (6%) of the wavelength. The angle θ between the sides is most commonly 90°. The gain increases as the angle narrows, but the increase below 90° is minimal, and requires longer reflector screens be used. However, angles down to 45° have been used.

The spacing (S) of the driven element in front of the point where the reflectors meet is approximately 0.5 λ but is not very critical; for 90° antennas the gain doesn't vary more than 1.5 dB for S between 0.25 λ and 0.75 λ. The radiation resistance of the dipole increases with this spacing, so the spacing can be adjusted to match the driven element to the feed line. Bowtie driven elements are often used for wide bandwidth applications like television antennas.

The antenna can be regarded as a form of directive antenna with a gain intermediate between a plane reflective array antenna and a parabolic antenna. Corner reflector antennas are particularly suitable in applications where a broadband directional antenna around one to 1 1/2 wavelengths in size is needed. A parabolic dish this size has no advantage in gain over the corner reflector, so its simplicity of design and construction make it attractive.

== Variations ==
Several different variations of the antenna are used

- The single driven element can be replaced by a Yagi array. UHF Yagi television antennas very often use a corner reflector. These antennas actually function more like two separate antennas: the corner reflector and driven element serves to provide broad bandwidth gain at the lower end of the UHF band, while the Yagi array is cut to give extra gain at the high end of the band.
- Monopole versions for use at lower frequencies have been built by placing vertical reflecting screens behind a vertical monopole antenna.

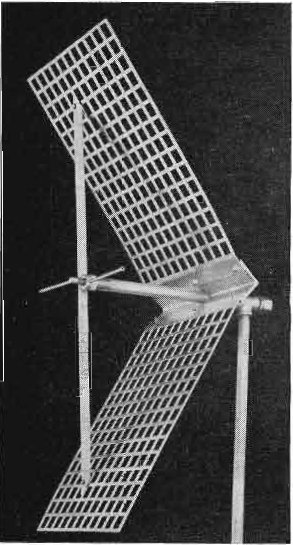
450 MHz homemade corner reflector

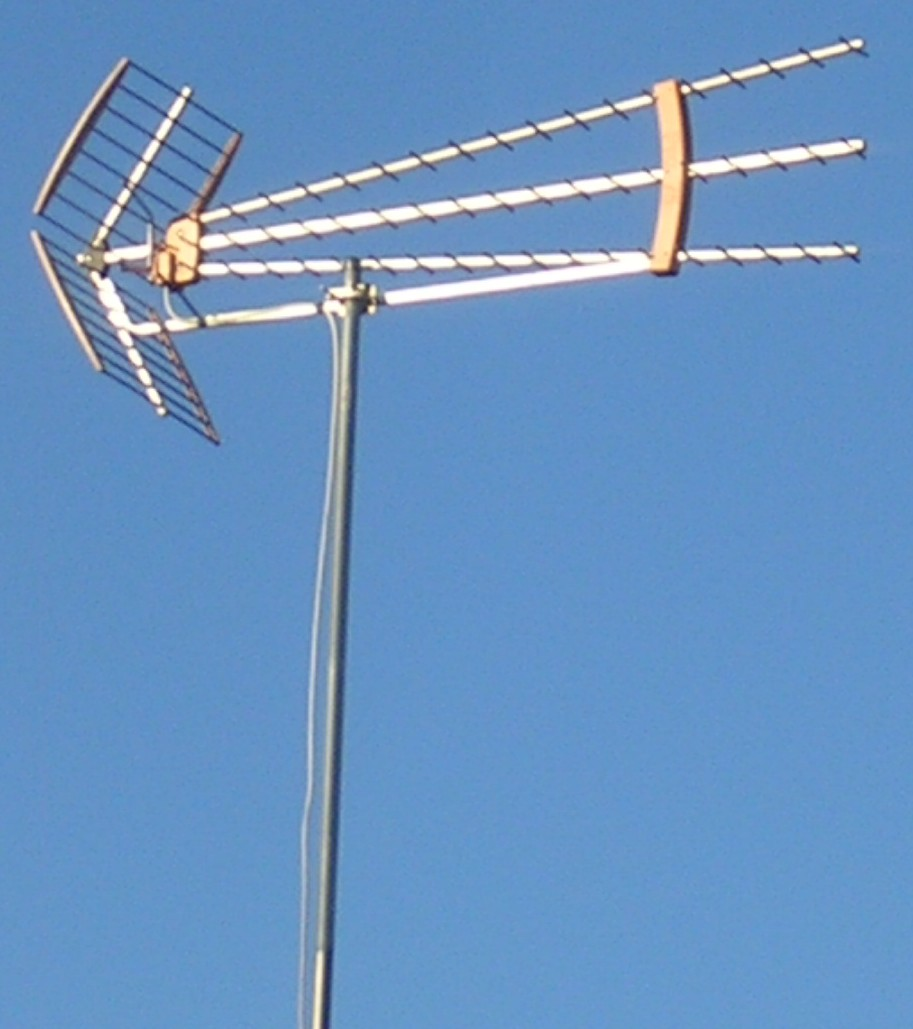
Modern UHF TV antenna consisting of 3 Yagi arrays in front of a common corner reflector

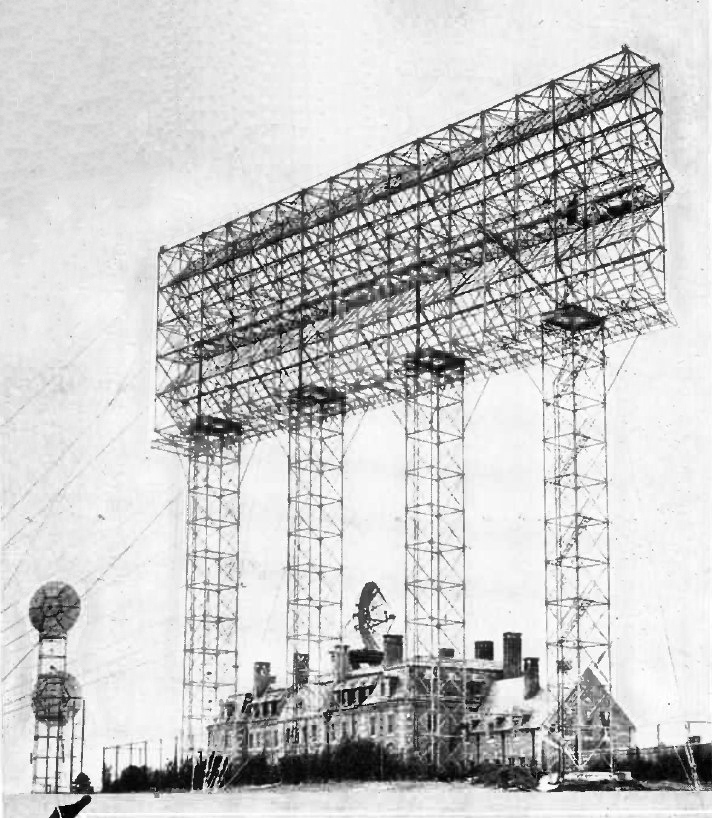
Large 37-meter-high (120 ft) two-bay corner reflector antenna for military troposcatter communication link, Massachusetts, 1955

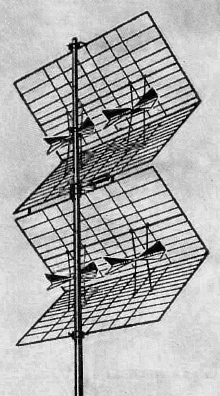
Dual stacked corner reflector UHF TV antenna. Stacking 2 antennas increases horizontal gain 3 dB.

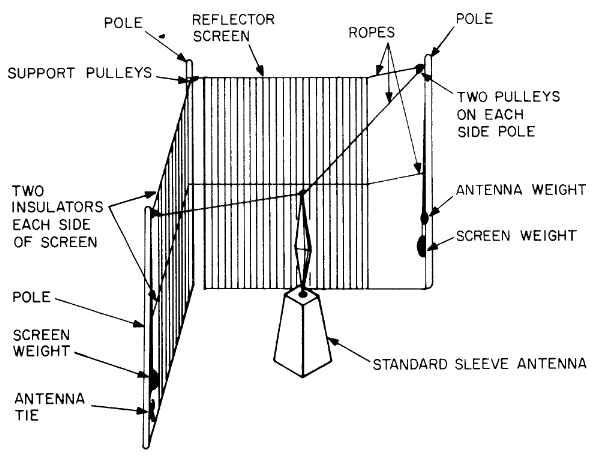
Vertical monopole corner reflector for HF transmission
