= Moxon antenna =

Rectangular two-element array antenna

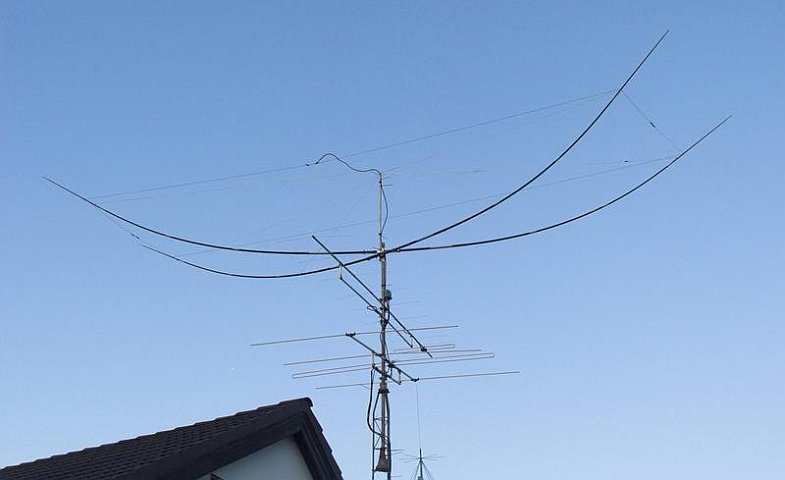
Moxon antenna for the 20-meter band. The antenna is the faint rectangle of wires held in tension by the bent X-shaped support frame.

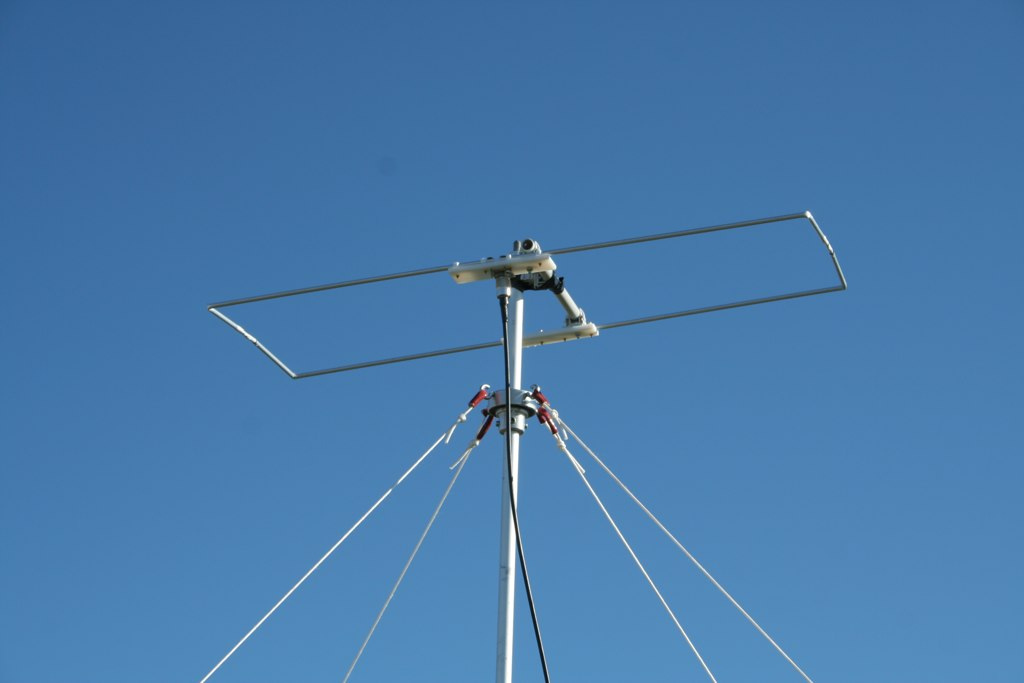
Moxon antenna for the 2-meter band

The Moxon antenna or Moxon rectangle is a simple and mechanically rugged two-element parasitic array, single-frequency antenna. It takes its name from the amateur radio operator and antenna handbook author Les Moxon (call sign G6XN).

== Design ==
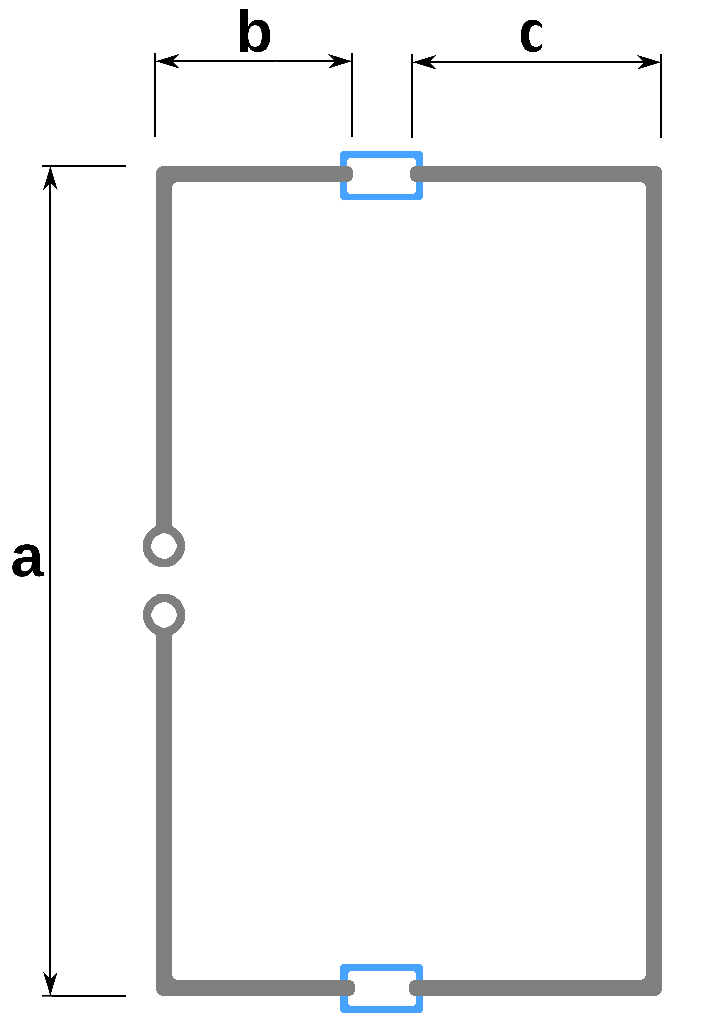
Layout of Moxon antenna; radiates strongest towards the left. (Note: Scale factor λ = free-space wavelength = c_{o}/ f = ( 299.79 m )/( f [in MHz] ) . Approximate dimensions: a ≈ 0.375 · λ ; b ≈ 0.0575 · λ ; c ≈ 0.0675 · λ ; driven element a + 2 b ≈ 0.49 · λ ; reflector a + 2 c ≈ 0.51 · λ ; expected gain ≈ 5 dBi; front-to-back ratio ≈ 20 dB.)

The Moxon antenna design is rectangular, with slightly less than half of the rectangle being the driven element (radiator) and the other part (slightly more than half) being the reflector. It is a two element Yagi-Uda antenna with folded dipole elements, and no director(s).

Because of the folded ends, the element lengths are approximately 70% of the equivalent dipole length. The two-element design gives modest directivity (about 2.0 dB) with a null towards the rear of the antenna, yielding a high front-to-back ratio up to 9.7 dB can be achieved at 28 MHz. Because the placement and size of the parasitic reflector both depend highly on wavelength, each Moxon antenna functions properly on the frequency band for which it is designed.

Portable Moxon rectangles are favored by radio amateurs for field day and emergency communications use because of their light weight and robust construction.

== Practical construction ==
The Moxon antenna is popular with amateur radio enthusiasts for its simplicity of construction. The drawing shows the system of construction. The driven element to the left is slightly shorter than a half-wavelength, and the parasitic reflector on the right is slightly longer than a half-wavelength. The ends of the two are mechanically connected with an insulator (blue in the drawing). The antenna is in layout similar to the well known VK2ABQ-square. For use on shortwave bands, spreaders are commonly made of bamboo or glass-fiber reinforced plastics, carrying a radiator and reflector made from wire. Such antennas can be built with little wind load and minimal weight. For VHF and UHF Moxon antennas are small enough that they are more often made from around 3/8 ~ 3/4 inch diameter aluminum tubing, to take advantage of the broader resonant bandwidth, without suffering from excessive wind load.

L.B. Cebik (W4RNL) made detailed comparisons and calculations of several different versions of Moxon antennas. Maguire (AC6LA) provides a calculator which is based on empirical formulas developed by Cebik.

== Sources ==
- Baker, Allen (April 2004). "A 6 meter Moxon antenna". QST Magazine. American Radio Relay League.
