= Gizmotchy =

Radio antenna

A schematic drawing of a Gizmotchy antenna

A Gizmotchy is an antenna developed in the early 1960s for citizens band radio by the Utica Radio Corporation. In the mid-1960s the patent was acquired by the Charles Radio Company and the antenna is now marketed as the Charles Gizmotchy.

The Gizmotchy is a variation of the Yagi. Each element consists of three rods arranged 120 degrees apart in an inverted "Y" configuration. The driven element is essentially a three-part dipole. One of these rods is the vertical driven rod, and one is the horizontal driven rod. The third rod is what would be the other half of a regular dipole and points downward 120 degrees from vertical on the opposite side of the support pole from the downward-pointing driven rod. The other elements are parasitic radiators like those of a Yagi except consisting of inverted "Y"s.

Like the Yagi, the Gizmotchy is a directional antenna with a forward gain of approximately 12 dBi and a front-to-back ratio of 28 dB. The unique design of the Gizmotchy allows both vertical or horizontal polarization, through the use of separate gamma matches and transmission lines.

== See also ==
- Antenna (radio)
- Yagi antenna
- Turnstile antenna
