= Douglas Werner =

American engineer and scientist

Douglas H. Werner
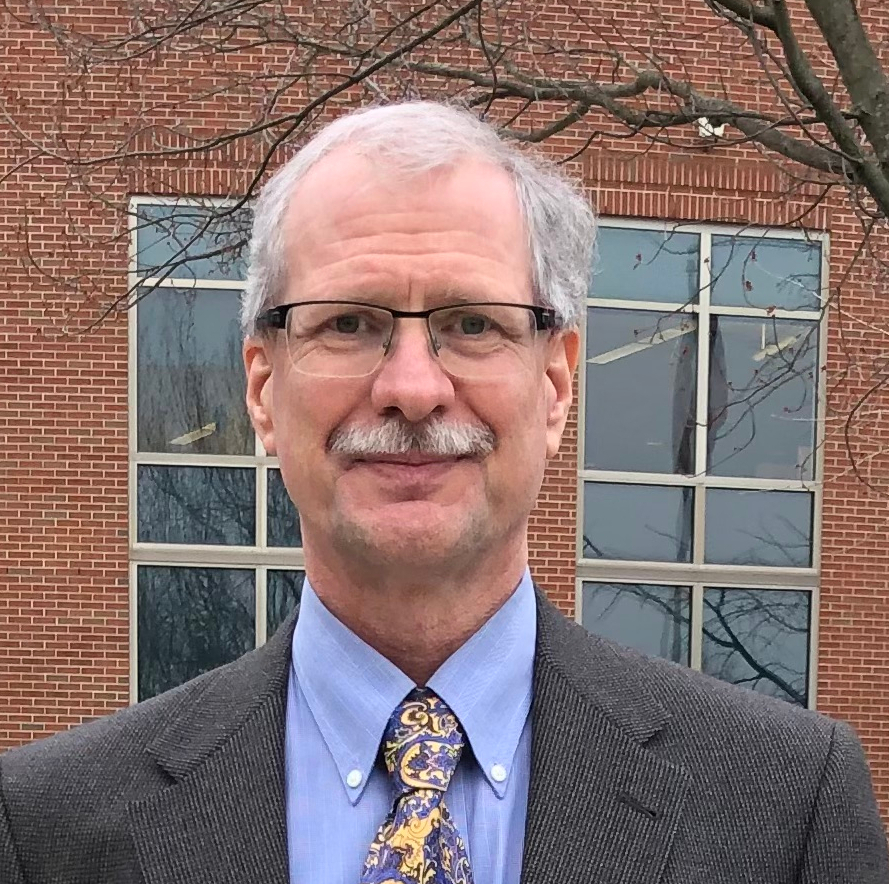
- Born: Douglas Henry Werner
- Education: The Pennsylvania State University
- Known for: Antenna theory and design, optical design, computational electromagnetics, nano-electromagnetics, metamaterials, evolutionary algorithms
- Scientific career
- Fields: Electrical engineering

Douglas Henry Werner is an American scientist and engineer. He holds the John L. and Genevieve H. McCain Chair Professorship in the Penn State Department of Electrical Engineering and is the director of the Penn State University Computational Electromagnetics and Antennas Research Laboratory. Werner holds 20 patents and has over 1090 publications. He is the author/co-author of 8 books. His h-index and number of citations are recorded on his Google Scholar profile. He is internationally recognized for his expertise in electromagnetics, antenna design, optical metamaterials and metamaterial-enabled devices as well as for the development/application of inverse-design techniques.

== Biography ==
Douglas Werner received the B.S., M.S., and Ph.D. degrees in electrical engineering and the M.A. degree in mathematics from the Pennsylvania State University (Penn State), University Park, PA in 1983, 1985, 1989, and 1986, respectively. He joined the electrical engineering faculty at Penn State in 1998. He is the director of the Penn State University Computational Electromagnetics and Antennas Research Laboratory. He is also a faculty member of the Materials Research Institute at Penn State.

He has made research contributions to the areas of computational electromagnetics (MoM, FEM, FEBI, FDTD, DGTD, CBFM, RCWA, GO, GTD/UTD, etc.), antenna theory and design, phased arrays (including ultra-wideband arrays), microwave devices, wireless and personal communication systems (including on-body networks), wearable and e-textile antennas, RFID tag antennas, conformal antennas, reconfigurable antennas, frequency selective surfaces, electromagnetic wave interactions with complex media, metamaterials, electromagnetic bandgap materials, zero and negative index materials, transformation optics, nanoscale electromagnetics (including nanoantennas), fractal and knot electrodynamics, and nature-inspired optimization techniques (genetic algorithms, clonal selection algorithms, particle swarm, wind driven optimization, and various other evolutionary programming schemes).

Werner's work has been regarded for its real-world applicability and has served to advance the state of the art in electromagnetics design.

== Awards and honors ==
- The IEEE Antennas and Propagation Society 2024 Harrington-Mittra Award in Computational Electromagnetics for “innovative contributions to the development of computational electromagnetics and optimization techniques for the simulation and inverse-design of antennas, metamaterials, and optical devices” (2024).
- Fellow, the American Association for the Advancement of Science (AAAS)
- The IEEE Antennas and Propagation Society 2023 John Kraus Antenna Award for "innovative contributions to antenna theory and design including the application of transformation electromagnetics, metamaterials and global optimization techniques."
- Fellow, the Asia-Pacific Artificial Intelligence Association (AAIA).
- Fellow and Life Member, the National Academy of Inventors
- Fellow, the Institute of Electrical and Electronics Engineers.
- Fellow, the Institution of Engineering Technology (IET – formerly IEE).
- Fellow and Life Member, the Applied Computational Electromagnetics Society (ACES).
- Fellow and Life Member, Optica (formerly OSA).
- Fellow, the Electromagnetics Academy, Progress in Electromagnetics Research Society (PIER).
- Fellow, the International Society for Optics and Photonics (SPIE).
- The IEEE Antennas and Propagation Society 2019 Chen-To Tai Distinguished Educator Award for “exemplary achievements in higher education as an inspiring teacher and mentor, and for innovative contributions to advancing knowledge in electromagnetics” (2019).
- The Applied Computational Electromagnetics Society (ACES) Computational Electromagnetics Award (the highest honor given by the society) for “widespread contributions to global optimization and CEM techniques applied to antennas, metamaterials and other electromagnetic devices” (2019).
- DoD Ordnance Technology Consortium (DOTC) Outstanding Technical Achievement Award; selected out of over 400 programs (2018).
- The Applied Computational Electromagnetics Society (ACES) Technical Achievement Award for “pioneering the wide-spread use of global optimization techniques for antenna array and metamaterial design” (2015).
- The IEEE Antennas and Propagation Society Harold A. Wheeler Applications Prize Paper Award; the best applications paper published in the IEEE Transactions on Antennas and Propagation (2014).
- The IEEE Antennas and Propagation Society Student Paper Contest Finalist with Honorable Mention and Travel Award. Thesis advisor (2013).
- The IEEE Antennas and Propagation Society Edward E. Altshuler Prize Paper Award; the best paper published in the IEEE Antennas and Propagation Society Magazine (2011).
- Penn State Engineering Society (PSES) Premier Research Award (2009).

== Books ==
- Advances in Electromagnetics Empowered by Artificial Intelligence and Deep Learning, IEEE Press/Wiley, 2023. ISBN 978-1-119-66296-9.
- Electromagnetic Vortices: Wave Phenomena and Engineering Applications, John Wiley & Sons, Inc., Newark, NJ, 2021. ISBN 978-1-119-66296-9.
- Nanoantennas and Plasmonics: Modelling, Design Fabrication, SciTech Publishing, 2020. ISBN 978-1-78561-837-6.
- Broadband Metamaterials in Electromagnetics: Technology and Applications, Pan Stanford Publishing, 2017. ISBN 9781315364438.
- Electromagnetics of Body-Area Networks: Antennas, Propagation, and RF Systems, Wiley/IEEE Press, September 2016. ISBN 978-1-119-02946-5.
- Transformation Electromagnetics and Metamaterials: Fundamental Principles and Applications, Springer-Verlag, London, UK, 2014. ISBN 978-1-4471-4996-5.
- Genetic Algorithms in Electromagnetics, John Wiley & Sons, Inc., Hoboken, NJ, 2007. ISBN 978-0-471-48889-7.
- Frontiers in Electromagnetics, IEEE Press/Wiley, 2000. ISBN 978-0-780-34701-4.
