= Shintaro Uda =

Japanese inventor

- 宇田 新太郎
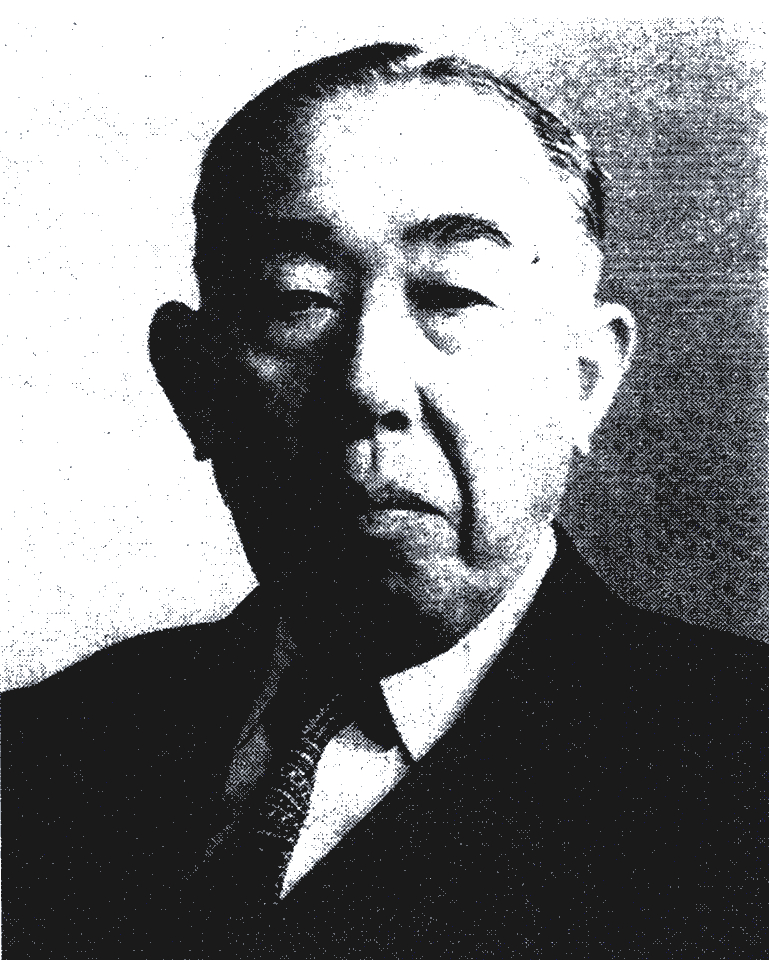
- Pronunciation: Uda Shintarō
- Born: June 1, 1896
- Died: August 18, 1976 (aged 80)
- Education: Tohoku University
- Known for: Inventing the Yagi–Uda antenna
- Awards: Japan Academy Prize

Yagi–Uda antenna design for communication at a wavelength of λ.

Shintaro Uda (宇田 新太郎, Uda Shintarō; June 1, 1896 – August 18, 1976) was a Japanese inventor, and assistant to Professor Hidetsugu Yagi at Tohoku Imperial University, where together they invented the Yagi–Uda antenna in 1926.

In February 1926, Yagi and Uda published their first report on the wave projector antenna in a Japanese publication. Yagi applied for patents on the new antenna both in Japan and the United States. His U.S. patent 1,860,123 ("Variable Directional Electric Wave Generating Device") was issued in May 1932 and assigned to the Radio Corporation of America.

== Sources ==
- Scanning the Past: A History of Electrical Engineering from the Past
- The history of amateur radio - 8, see chapter "Yagi-Uda's invention".
