= Conformal antenna =

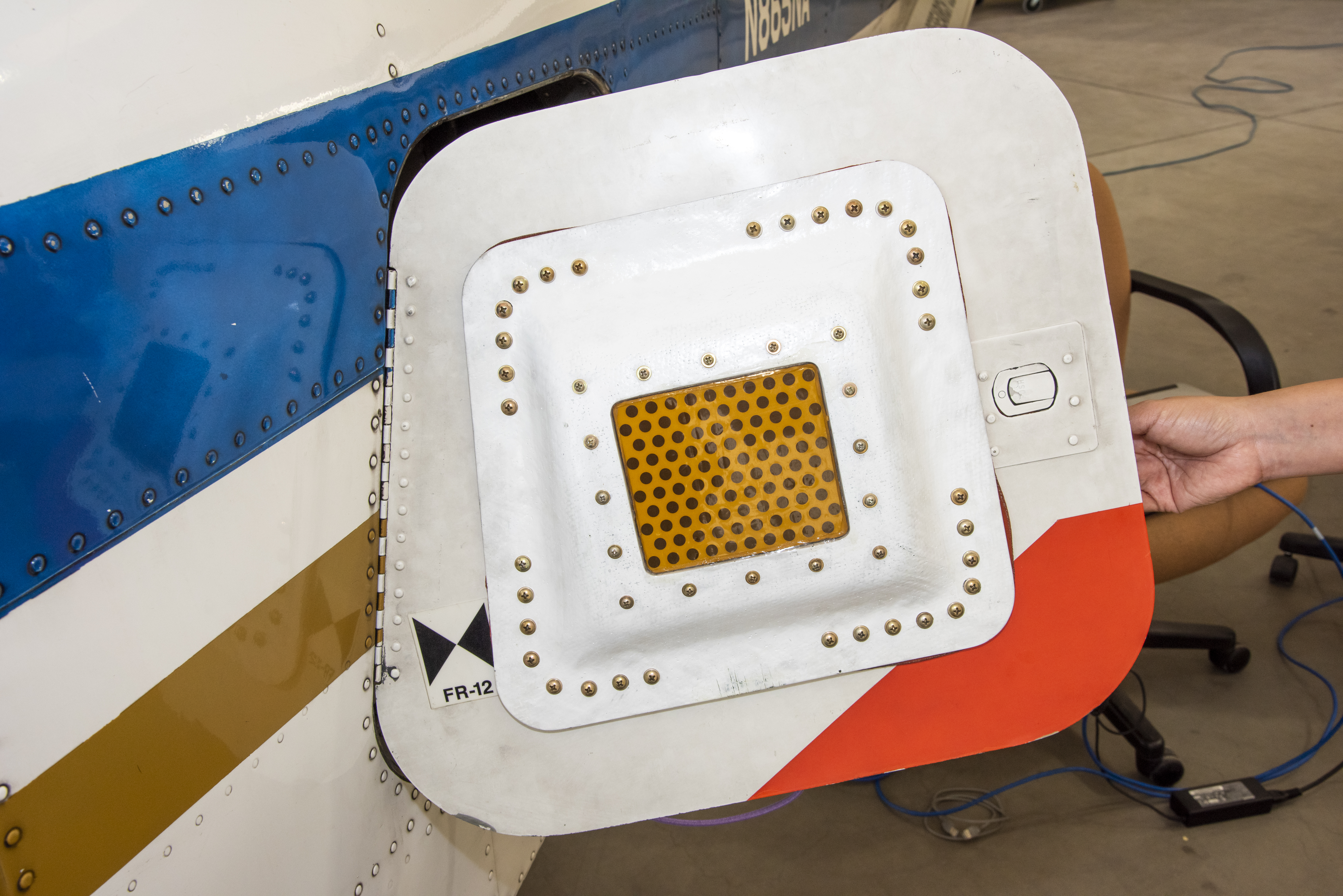
Conformal antenna installed on the door of T-34C aircraft

In radio communication and avionics a conformal antenna or conformal array is a flat array antenna which is designed to conform or follow some prescribed shape, for example a flat curving antenna which is mounted on or embedded in a curved surface. It consists of multiple individual antennas mounted on or in the curved surface which work together as a single antenna to transmit or receive radio waves. Conformal antennas were developed in the 1980s as avionics antennas integrated into the curving skin of military aircraft to reduce aerodynamic drag, replacing conventional antenna designs which project from the aircraft surface. Military aircraft and missiles are the largest application of conformal antennas, but they are also used in some civilian aircraft, military ships and land vehicles. As the cost of the required processing technology comes down, they are being considered for use in civilian applications such as train antennas, car radio antennas, and cellular base station antennas, to save space and also to make the antenna less visually intrusive by integrating it into existing objects.

== Advantages ==
In modern aircraft, a wide variety of antennas are needed for essential functions like navigation, communication systems, instrument landing, and radar altimeter. These antennas, often numbering between 20 and 70 on military aircraft, significantly increase aerodynamic drag and fuel consumption []. To reduce these negative effects, integrating antennas into the aircraft’s surface, known as conformal antennas, offers a highly effective solution []. Conformal antennas streamline the aircraft by embedding the antennas into the skin, preserving aerodynamics while maintaining functionality.

== How it works ==
Conformal antennas are a form of phased array antenna. They are composed of an array of many identical small flat antenna elements, such as dipole, horn, or patch antennas, covering the surface. At each antenna the current from the transmitter passes through a phase shifter device which are all controlled by a microprocessor (computer). By controlling the phase of the feed current, the nondirectional radio waves emitted by the individual antennas can be made to combine in front of the antenna by the process of interference, forming a strong beam (or beams) of radio waves pointed in any desired direction. In a receiving antenna the weak individual radio signals received by each antenna element are combined in the correct phase to enhance signals coming from a particular direction, so the antenna can be made sensitive to the signal from a particular station and reject interfering signals from other directions.

In a conventional phased array the individual antenna elements are mounted on a flat surface. In a conformal antenna, they are mounted on a curved surface, and the phase shifters also compensate for the different phase shifts caused by the varying path lengths of the radio waves due to the location of the individual antennas on the curved surface. Because the individual antenna elements must be small, conformal arrays are typically limited to high frequencies in the UHF or microwave range, where the wavelength of the waves is small enough that small antennas can be used.
