= Driven and parasitic elements =

Radio aerial composed of directly-connected and passive elements

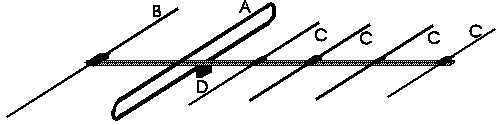
Yagi antenna with one driven element (A) called a folded dipole, and 5 parasitic elements: one reflector (B) and 4 directors (C). The feed line leading to the receiver is not shown; it attaches to the driven element at D. The antenna radiates radio waves in a beam toward the right.

In an antenna array made of multiple conductive elements (typically metal rods), a driven element or active element (also called driven radiator or active radiator) is electrically connected to the receiver or transmitter while a parasitic element (or passive radiator) is not.

== Driven elements ==
In a multielement antenna array (such as a Yagi–Uda antenna), the driven element (or active element) is an antenna element that is directly excited by the feed system in a transmitting antenna, or from which the received signal is taken in a receiving antenna. In a transmitting antenna it is driven or excited by the radio frequency current from the transmitter, and is the source of the radio waves. In a receiving antenna, it couples energy from the incoming electromagnetic wave into an electrical signal in the antenna circuit, which are applied to the receiver. Multielement antennas like the Yagi typically consist of a driven element, connected to the receiver or transmitter through a feed line, and a number of other elements which are not driven, called parasitic elements. The driven element is often a dipole. The parasitic elements couple electromagnetically with the driven element and re-radiate the induced currents, modifying the radiation pattern and impedance of the antenna, and serve to modify the radiation pattern of the antenna, directing the radio waves in one direction, increasing the gain of the antenna.

An antenna may have more than one driven element, although the most common multielement antenna, the Yagi, usually has only one. For example, transmitting antennas for AM radio stations often consist of several mast radiators, each of which functions as a half-wave monopole driven element, to create a particular radiation pattern.Under the appropriate array-theory assumptions, two elements spaced λ/4 and carrying equal-amplitude currents with a 90° relative phase can produce a cardioid-type array factor. A log-periodic antenna (LPDA) consists of many dipole elements of decreasing length, all of which are driven. However, because they are different lengths, only one of the many dipoles is resonant at a given frequency, so only one is driven at a time. The position of the active region depends on the frequency of the signal, with different groups of elements contributing most strongly at different frequencies. Phased arrays may have hundreds of driven elements. Household multiband television antennas often combine a Yagi-type UHF section with a log-periodic or similar broadband VHF section. The VHF and UHF sections are combined through an appropriate feed or matching network, typically providing a 75 Ω output for the coaxial downlead.

When a "driven element" is referred to in an antenna array, it is often assumed that other elements are not driven (i.e. passive radiator) and that the array is tightly coupled (spacing far below a wavelength).

== Parasitic elements ==
In a radio antenna, a parasitic element or passive radiator is a conductive element, typically a metal rod, which is not electrically connected to anything else. Multielement antennas such as the Yagi–Uda antenna typically consist of a "driven element" which is connected to the radio receiver or transmitter through a feed line, and parasitic elements, which are not. The purpose of the parasitic elements is to modify the radiation pattern of the radio waves emitted by the driven element, directing them in a beam in one direction, increasing the antenna's directivity (gain). A parasitic element does this by acting as a passive resonator, something like a guitar's sound box, absorbing the radio waves from the nearby driven element and re-radiating them again with a different phase. The waves from the different antenna elements interfere, strengthening the antenna's radiation in the desired direction, and cancelling out the waves in undesired directions.

The parasitic elements in a Yagi antenna are mounted parallel to the driven element, with all the elements usually in a line perpendicular to the direction of radiation of the antenna. What effect a parasitic element has on the radiation pattern depends both on its separation from the next element, and on its length. The driven element of the antenna is usually a half-wave dipole, its length half a wavelength of the radio waves used. The parasitic elements are of two types. A "reflector" is slightly longer (around 5%) than a half-wavelength. It serves to reflect the radio waves in the opposite direction. A "director" is slightly shorter than a half-wavelength; it serves to increase the radiation in a given direction. A Yagi antenna may have a reflector on one side of the driven element, and one or more directors on the other side. If all the elements are in a plane, usually only one reflector is used, because additional ones give little improvement in gain, but sometimes additional reflectors are mounted above and below the plane of the antenna on a vertical bracket at the end.

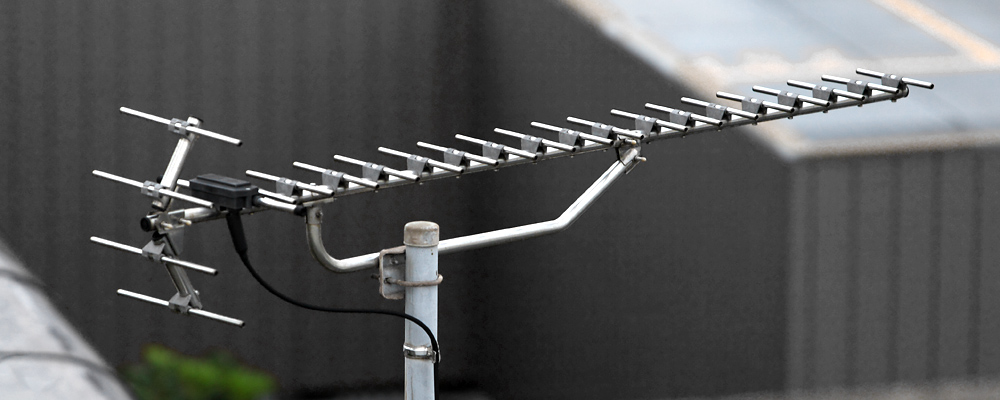
Yagi antenna for UHF TV reception with 22 parasitic elements; 4 reflectors attached to the vertical bracket at left, and 18 directors attached to the horizontal beam at right. The driven element is attached to the black box next to the reflectors. The antenna is most sensitive to radio waves coming from the right, parallel to the antenna's axis.

All the elements are usually mounted on a metal beam or bracket along the antenna's central axis. Although sometimes the parasitic elements are insulated from the supporting beam, often they are clamped or welded directly to it, electrically connected to it. This doesn't affect their functioning, because the RF voltage distribution along the element is maximum at the ends and goes to zero (has a node) at the midpoint where the grounded beam is attached.

The addition of parasitic elements gives a diminishing improvement in the antenna's gain. Adding a reflector to a dipole, to make a 2 element Yagi, increases the gain by about 5 dB over the dipole. Adding a director to this, to give a 3 element Yagi, gives a gain of about 7 dB over a dipole. As a rule of thumb, each additional parasitic element beyond this adds about 1 dB of gain.

In an example of a parasitic element that is not rod-shaped, a parasitic microstrip patch antenna is sometimes mounted above another driven patch antenna. This antenna combination resonates at a slightly lower frequency than the original element. However, the main effect is to greatly increase the impedance bandwidth of the antenna. In some cases the bandwidth can be increased by a factor of 10.

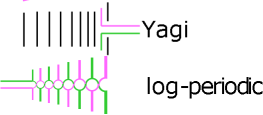
Comparison of a Yagi with parasitic elements to a log periodic, with all active elements

Not all types of thin conductor multielement antennas have parasitic elements. The log periodic antenna is similar in appearance to a Yagi, but all of its elements are driven elements, connected to the transmitter or receiver.
