= Broadcast band =

Radio spectrum band commonly used for broadcasting

A broadcast band is a segment of the radio spectrum used for broadcasting. Different types of broadcasting services use different segments of spectrum, in some cases depending on the country.

== Sound broadcasting ==
=== Longwave ===
Longwave broadcasting, primarily found in Europe, North Africa, and Asia, uses frequencies between 143.5 to 283.5 kHz in the low frequency (LF) band. These frequencies are not allocated for broadcasting in the Western Hemisphere.

=== Medium wave ===
The broadcast band most identified with AM broadcasting, though it also takes place on longwave and shortwave, is the medium wave, which was the main radio band for broadcasting from its beginnings until FM broadcasting came into vogue. Stations are allocated to center frequencies between 530 or 531 and 1600 kHz (1700 kHz in the Americas and Australia, which use an expanded band), with spacing of 9 kHz between channels in most of the world except for the Americas, which use 10 kHz spacing.

=== Shortwave ===
Shortwave radio, used for long-distance communication, takes place in multiple bands ranging from 2.3 to 26.1 MHz but named for their wavelength in meters, defined at the 1997 World Radiocommunication Conference. Most international broadcasters use amplitude modulation with 5 kHz steps between channels; a few use single sideband or reduced carrier single sideband modulation.

=== FM radio ===
In most of the world, FM broadcasting takes place on Band II (87, 87.5, or 88 to 108 MHz) within the very high frequency (VHF) range. Some countries historically or currently use other bands:

- The International Radio and Television Organisation (OIRT) band in Eastern Europe is from 65.9 to 74.0 MHz and is still used in some former Soviet republics. In the OIRT band, stations are spaced on 30 kHz multiples.
- Japan's FM band ranges from 76 to 95 MHz.
- Brazil extended the FM band to begin at 76 MHz, with the first extended FM stations beginning broadcasts in 2021, and has since been joined by Chile. The frequencies 76–88 MHz had been used in these countries for analog television broadcasting.

Stations generally have center frequencies in multiples of 100 kHz, and depending on the ITU region, these may be odd multiples only (as in the Americas with the exception of Colombia), even multiples only, or both. In some countries, such as Italy, 50 kHz multiples are also used.

=== Digital audio ===
The European standard Digital Audio Broadcasting is generally broadcast in VHF Band III (174–240 MHz). It was previously authorized for use on the L band (1.452–1.492 GHz), though this was removed from the specification.

There are also techniques to broadcast digital sound accompanying other services in the bands used for analog AM and FM radio, known as in-band on-channel. The most prominent are HD Radio, used in North America, and Digital Radio Mondiale.

== Television broadcasting ==
For television broadcasting purposes, spectrum in VHF bands I and III and UHF bands IV and V is divided into channels, which depending on the country may be 6, 7, or 8 MHz in width. With the digital television transition in many countries, upper UHF spectrum has been taken out of service due to digital compression technology improving the efficiency of the remaining spectrum. This spectrum, known as a digital dividend, was then allocated for wireless services.

The method of transmitting television varies by country. The International Telecommunication Union designated 13 analog systems, lettered A through N and also characterized by combination with a color television standard. There are four main systems in use for digital television transition, each with their own variants: ATSC, DVB, ISDB, and DTMB.

== See also ==
- North American broadcast television frequencies
- AM broadcasting
- FM broadcasting
- Dead air
- Internet radio
- Radio network
- Music radio
- Old-time radio
- Radio astronomy
- Radio programming
- Types of radio emissions
