= Terrestrial television =

Television content transmitted via signals in the air

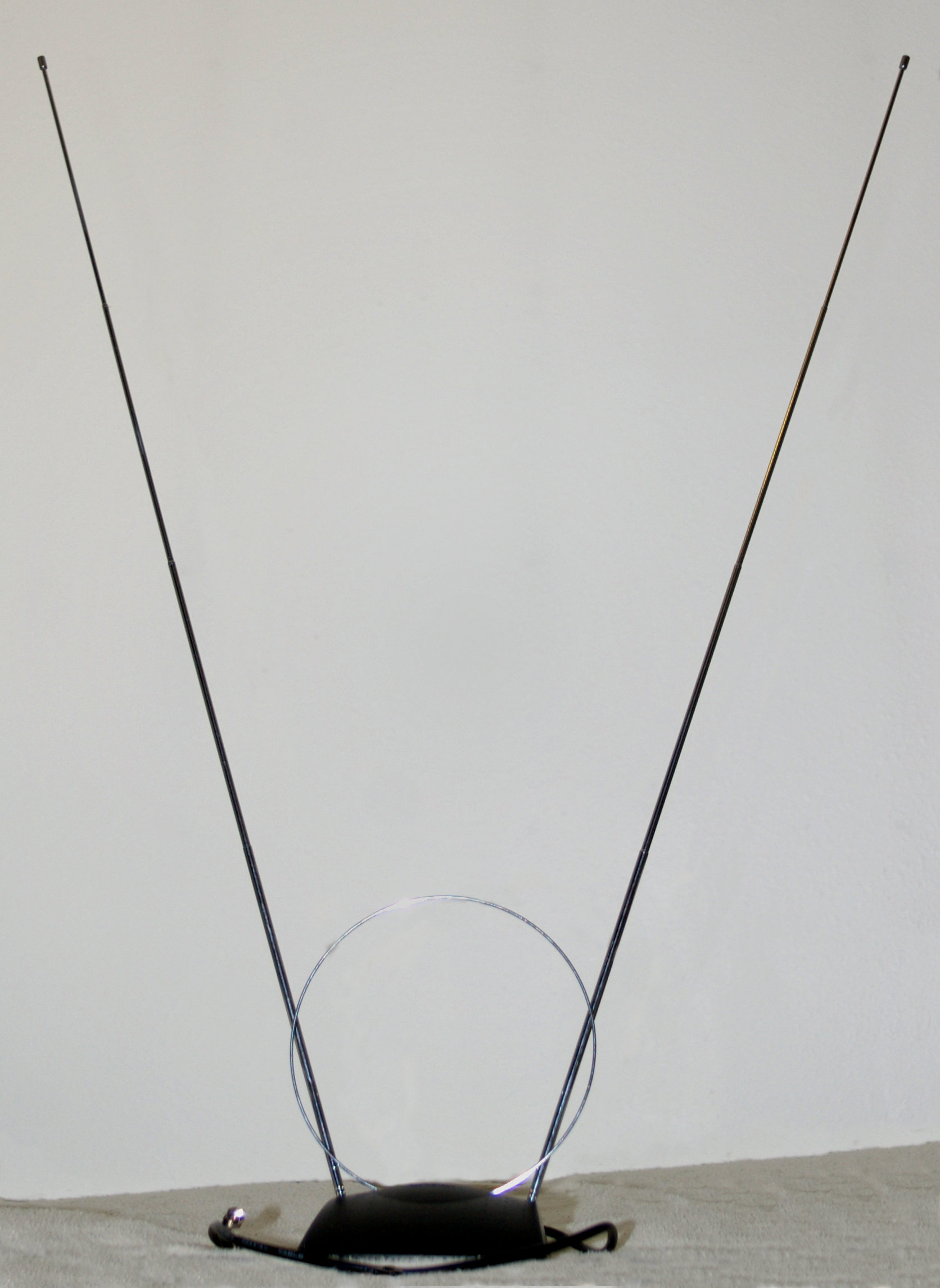
Indoor rabbit ears antenna often used for terrestrial television reception. This model also has a loop antenna for UHF reception.

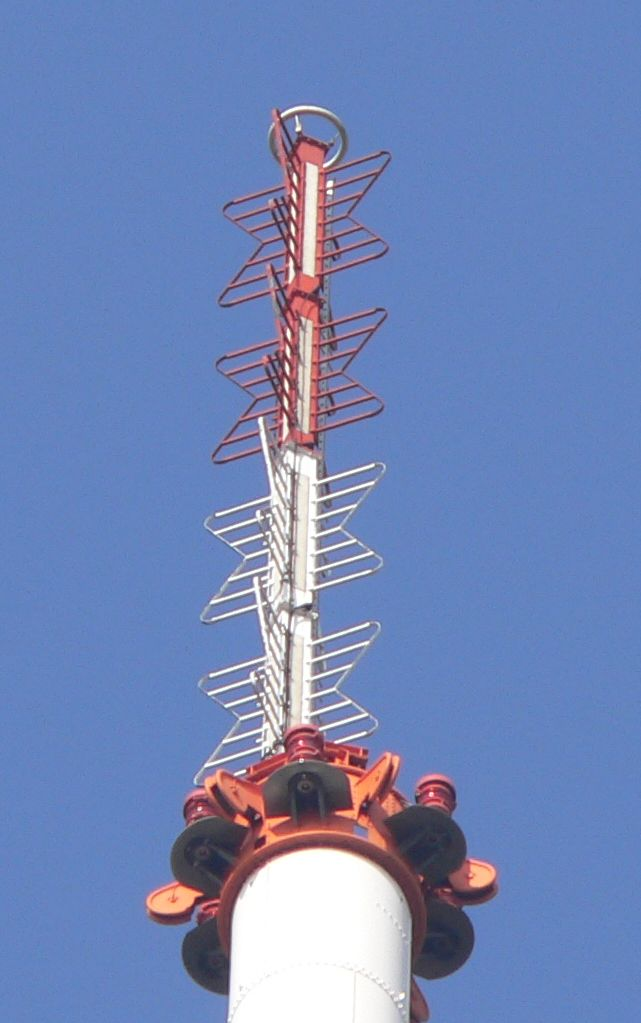
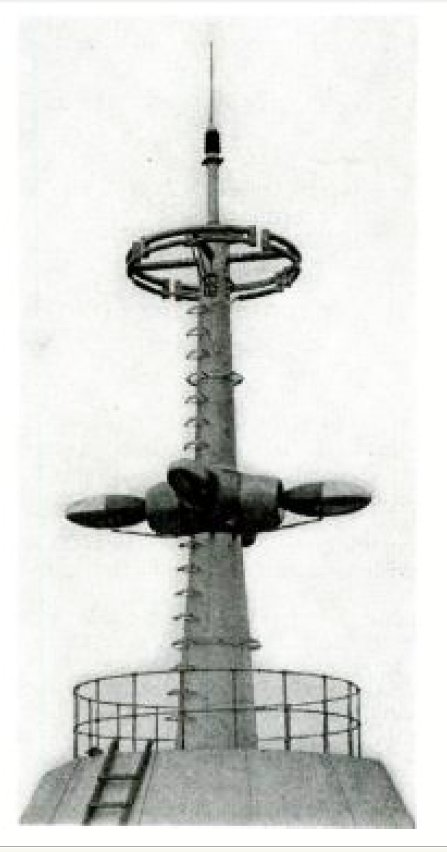
- (left) A television broadcasting antenna in Muehlacker, Germany
- (right) One of the first television broadcasting antennas, on the Empire State Building in New York City for NBC's experimental 46.5 MHz TV station W2XBS in 1939.

Terrestrial television, or over-the-air television (OTA), is a type of television broadcasting in which the content is transmitted via radio waves from the terrestrial (Earth-based) transmitter of a TV station to a TV receiver having an antenna. This type of TV broadcast is distinguished from newer technologies, such as satellite television (direct broadcast satellite or DBS television), in which the signal is transmitted to the receiver from an overhead satellite; cable television, in which the signal is carried to the receiver through a cable; and Internet Protocol television, in which the signal is received over an Internet stream or on a network utilizing the Internet Protocol. Terrestrial television stations broadcast on television channels with frequencies between about 52 and 600 MHz in the VHF and UHF bands. Since radio waves in these bands travel by line of sight, reception is generally limited by the visual horizon to distances of 64–97 kilometres (40–60 miles), although under better conditions and with tropospheric ducting, signals can sometimes be received hundreds of kilometers distant.

Terrestrial television was the first technology used for television broadcasting. The BBC began broadcasting in 1929 and by 1930 many radio stations had a regular schedule of experimental television programmes. However, these early experimental systems had insufficient picture quality to attract the public, due to their mechanical scan technology, and television did not become widespread until after World War II with the advent of electronic scan television technology. The television broadcasting business followed the model of radio networks, with local television stations in cities and towns affiliated with television networks, either commercial (in the US) or government-controlled (in Europe), which provided content. Television broadcasts were in greyscale (called black and white) until the transition to color television in the 1960s.

There was no other method of television delivery until the 1950s with the beginnings of cable television and community antenna television (CATV). CATV was initially only a rebroadcast of over-the-air signals. With the widespread adoption of cable across the United States in the 1970s and 1980s, viewing of terrestrial television broadcasts has been in decline; in 2018, it was estimated that about 14% of US households used an antenna. However, in certain other regions terrestrial television continue to be the preferred method of receiving television, and it is estimated by Deloitte as of 2020 that at least 1.6 billion people in the world receive at least some television using these means. The largest market is thought to be Indonesia, where 250 million people watch through terrestrial.

== Analog ==
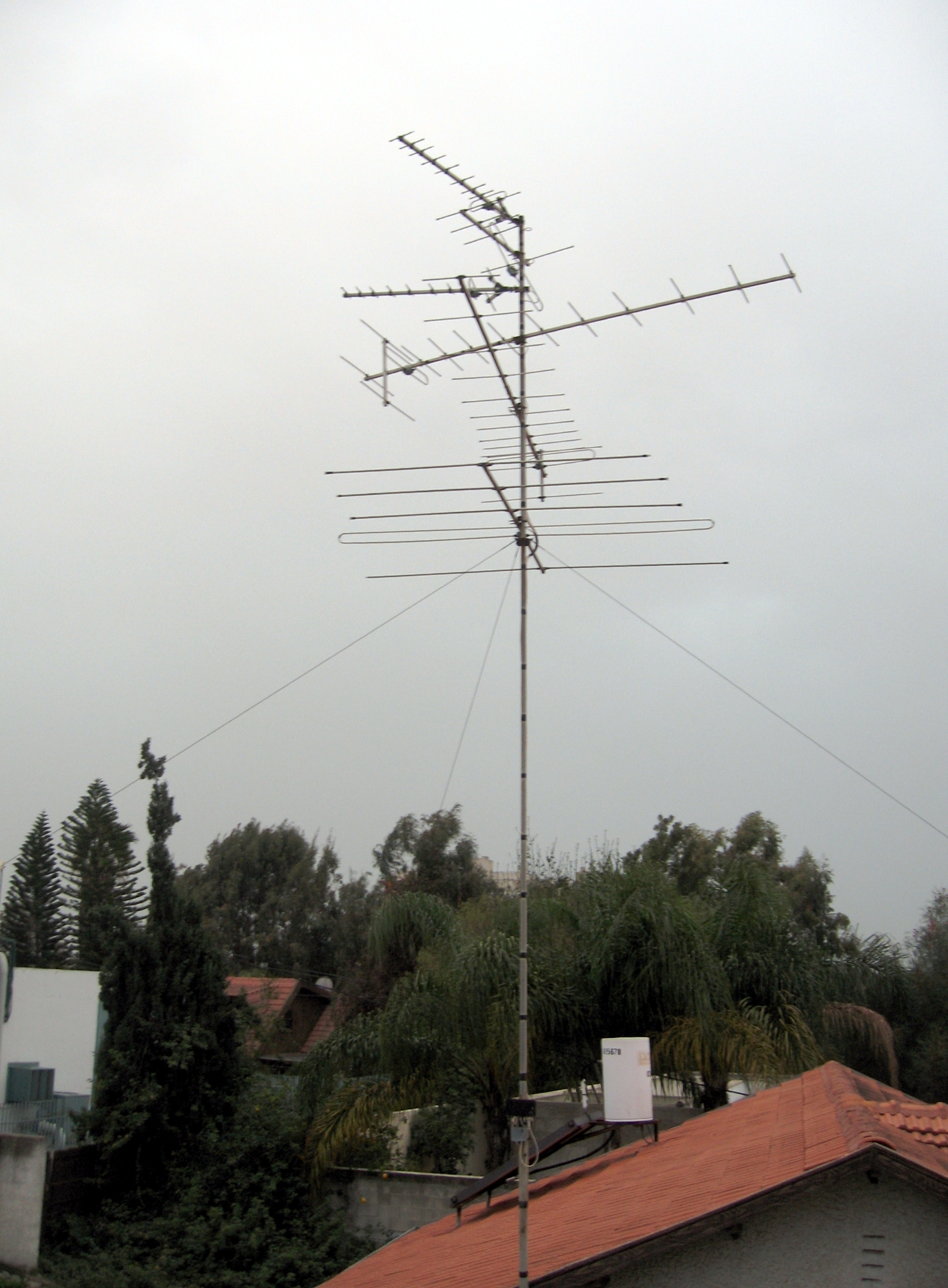
Rooftop television antennas like these are required to receive analog terrestrial television in fringe reception areas far from the transmitter.

=== Europe ===
Following the ST61 conference, UHF frequencies were first used in the UK in 1964 with the introduction of BBC2. In the UK, VHF channels were kept on the old 405-line system, while UHF was used solely for 625-line broadcasts (which later used PAL color). Television broadcasting in the 405-line system continued after the introduction of four analog programs in the UHF bands until the last 405-line transmitters were switched off on January 6, 1985. VHF Band III was used in other countries around Europe for PAL broadcasts until the planned phase-out and switchover to digital television.

The success of analog terrestrial television across Europe varied from country to country. Although each country had rights to a certain number of frequencies by virtue of the ST61 plan, not all of them were brought into service.

=== Americas ===
The first National Television System Committee standard was introduced in 1941. This standard defined a transmission scheme for a black-and-white picture with 525 lines of vertical resolution at 60 fields per second. In the early 1950s, this standard was superseded by a backward-compatible standard for color television. The NTSC standard was exclusively used in the Americas as well as Japan until the introduction of digital terrestrial television (DTT). While Mexico has ended all its analog television broadcasts and the United States and Canada have shut down nearly all of their analog TV stations, the NTSC standard continues to be used in the rest of Latin American countries except for Argentina, Paraguay and Uruguay, where the PAL-N standard is used while testing their DTT platform.

In the late 1990s and early 2000s, the Advanced Television Systems Committee developed the ATSC standard for digital high-definition terrestrial transmission. This standard was eventually adopted by many American countries, including the United States, Canada, Dominican Republic, Mexico, Argentina, El Salvador, Guatemala and Honduras; however, the four latter countries reversed their decision in favor of ISDB-Tb.

The Pan-American terrestrial television operates on analog channels 2 through 6 (VHF-low band, 54 to 88 MHz, known as band I in Europe), 7 through 13 (VHF-high band, 174 to 216 MHz, known as band III elsewhere), and 14 through 51 (UHF television band, 470 to 698 MHz, elsewhere bands IV and V). Unlike analog transmission, ATSC channel numbers do not correspond to radio frequencies. Instead, a virtual channel is defined as part of the ATSC stream metadata so that a station can transmit on any frequency but still show the same channel number. Additionally, free-to-air television repeaters and signal boosters can be used to rebroadcast a terrestrial television signal using an otherwise unused channel to cover areas with marginal reception. (see Pan-American television frequencies for frequency allocation charts)

Analog television channels 2 through 6, 7 through 13, and 14 through 51 are only used for LPTV translator stations in the United States. Channels 52 through 69 are still used by some existing stations, but these channels must be vacated if telecommunications companies notify the stations to vacate that signal spectrum. By convention, broadcast television signals are transmitted with horizontal polarization.

=== Asia ===
Terrestrial television broadcast in Asia started as early as 1939 in Japan through a series of experiments done by NHK Broadcasting Institute of Technology. However, these experiments were interrupted by the beginning of World War II in the Pacific. On February 1, 1953, NHK (Japan Broadcasting Corporation) began broadcasting. On August 28, 1953, Nippon TV (Nippon Television Network Corporation), the first commercial television broadcaster in Asia, was launched. Meanwhile, in the Philippines, Alto Broadcasting System (now ABS-CBN Corporation), the first commercial television broadcaster in Southeast Asia, launched its first commercial terrestrial television station DZAQ-TV on October 23, 1953, with the help of Radio Corporation of America (RCA).

== Digital ==
By the mid-1990s, the interest in digital television across Europe was such that CEPT convened the "Chester '97" conference to agree on means by which digital television could be inserted into the ST61 frequency plan.

The introduction of digital terrestrial television in the late 1990s and early years of the 21st century led the ITU to call a Regional Radiocommunication Conference to abrogate the ST61 plan and to put a new plan for DTT broadcasting only in its place.

In December 2005, the European Union decided to cease all analog audio and analog video television transmissions by 2012 and switch all terrestrial television broadcasting to digital audio and digital video (all EU countries have agreed on using DVB-T). The Netherlands completed the transition in December 2006, and some EU member states decided to complete their switchover as early as 2008 (Sweden), and (Denmark) in 2009. While the UK began to switch off analog broadcasts, region by region, in late 2007, it was not completed until 24 October 2012. Norway ceased all analog television transmissions on 1 December 2009. Two member states (not specified in the announcement) expressed concerns that they might not be able to proceed to the switchover by 2012 due to technical limitations; the rest of the EU member states had stopped analog television transmissions by the end of 2012.

Many countries are developing and evaluating digital terrestrial television systems.

Australia has adopted the DVB-T standards, and the government's industry regulator, the Australian Communications and Media Authority, mandated that all analog transmissions cease by 2012. Mandated digital conversion started early in 2009 with a graduated program. The first centre to experience analog switch-off was the remote Victorian regional town of Mildura. In 2010. The government supplied underprivileged households across the nation with free digital set-top converter boxes in order to minimize conversion disruption. Australia's major free-to-air television networks were all granted digital transmission licenses and are each required to broadcast at least one high-definition and one standard-definition channel into all of their markets.

In North America, a specification laid out by the ATSC has become the standard for digital terrestrial television. In the United States, the Federal Communications Commission (FCC) set the final deadline for the switch-off of analog service for 12 June 2009. All television receivers must now include a DTT tuner using ATSC. In Canada, the Canadian Radio-television and Telecommunications Commission (CRTC) set 31 August 2011 as the date that terrestrial analog transmission service ceased in metropolitan areas and provincial capitals. In Mexico, the Federal Telecommunications Institute (IFT) discontinued the use of analog terrestrial television on 31 December 2015.

ATSC 3.0 officially launched in select markets in 2020 is gradually replacing the earlier ATSC 1.0 standard, with over 60% of U.S. households now within range of ATSC 3.0 signals as of 2024. ATSC 3.0 is IP-based and supports advanced features including 4K UHD resolution, high dynamic range, wide color gamut, high frame rates, and immersive audio (e.g., Dolby AC-4). It also enables targeted advertising, enhanced emergency alerts, mobile TV reception, and hybrid broadcast-broadband services, offering interactivity akin to internet streaming platforms. ATSC 3.0 is not backward compatible with ATSC 1.0, requiring consumers to purchase compatible TVs or external tuners.

== See also ==
- Antenna farm
- Audience measurement
- Blackout (broadcasting)
- Broadcast call signs
- Broadcast license
- Broadcast range
- Broadcast relay station
- Broadcast syndication
- Broadcast television systems
- City of license
- Digital multimedia broadcasting
- Effects of time zones on North American broadcasting
- Emergency Broadcast System
- Independent station
- List of digital television deployments by country
- List of Formula One broadcasters
- List of Kentucky Derby broadcasters
- List of historical Major League Baseball television broadcasters
- List of current NFL broadcasters
- List of current National Hockey League broadcasters
- List of Super Bowl broadcasters
- List of World Series broadcasters
- List of current Women's National Basketball Association broadcasters
- List of television stations in North America by media market
- List of United States over-the-air television networks
- Lists of television channels for various lists
- Media market
- News broadcasting
- Public broadcasting
- Superstation
- Television system
- Pay television
