= Television antenna =

Antenna used with a television to receive television programs

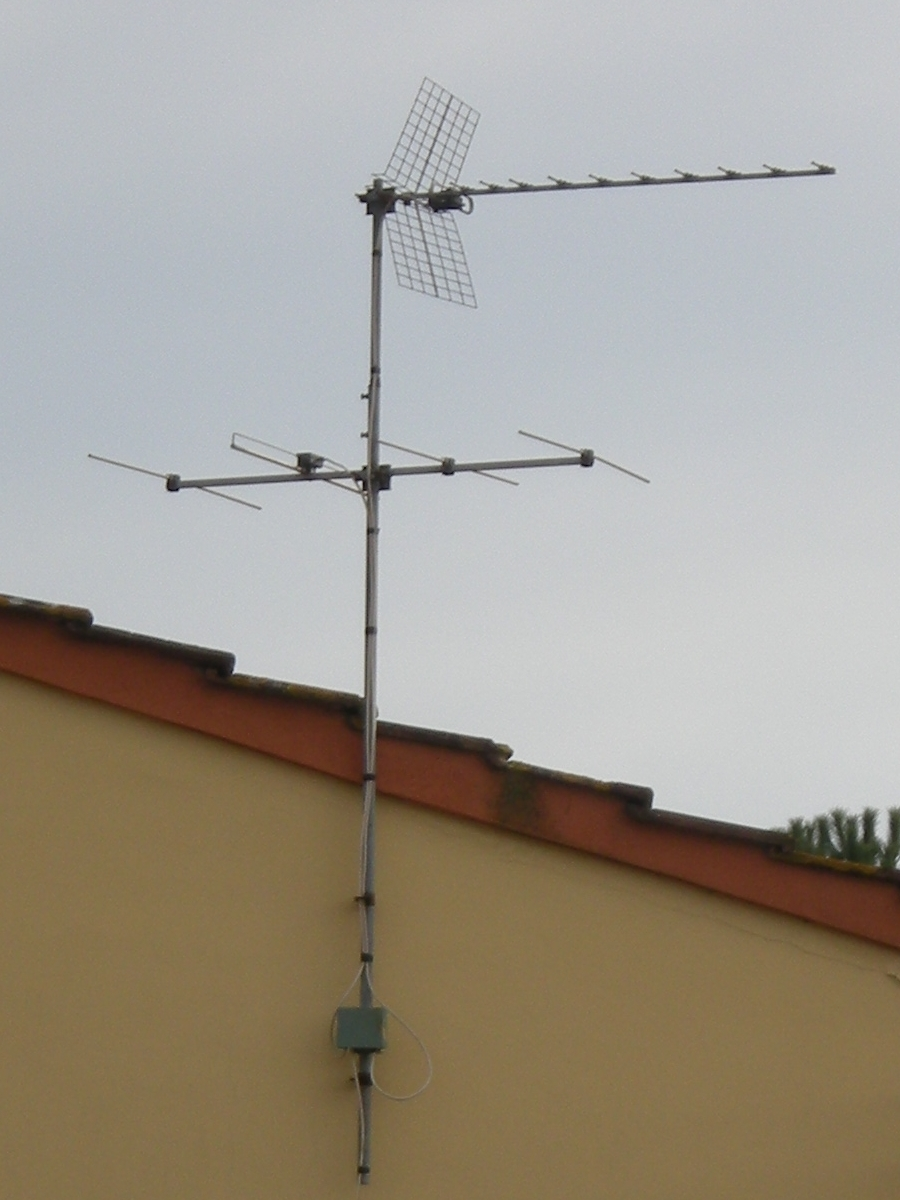
Two Yagi-Uda type outdoor antennas mounted at the side of a building.

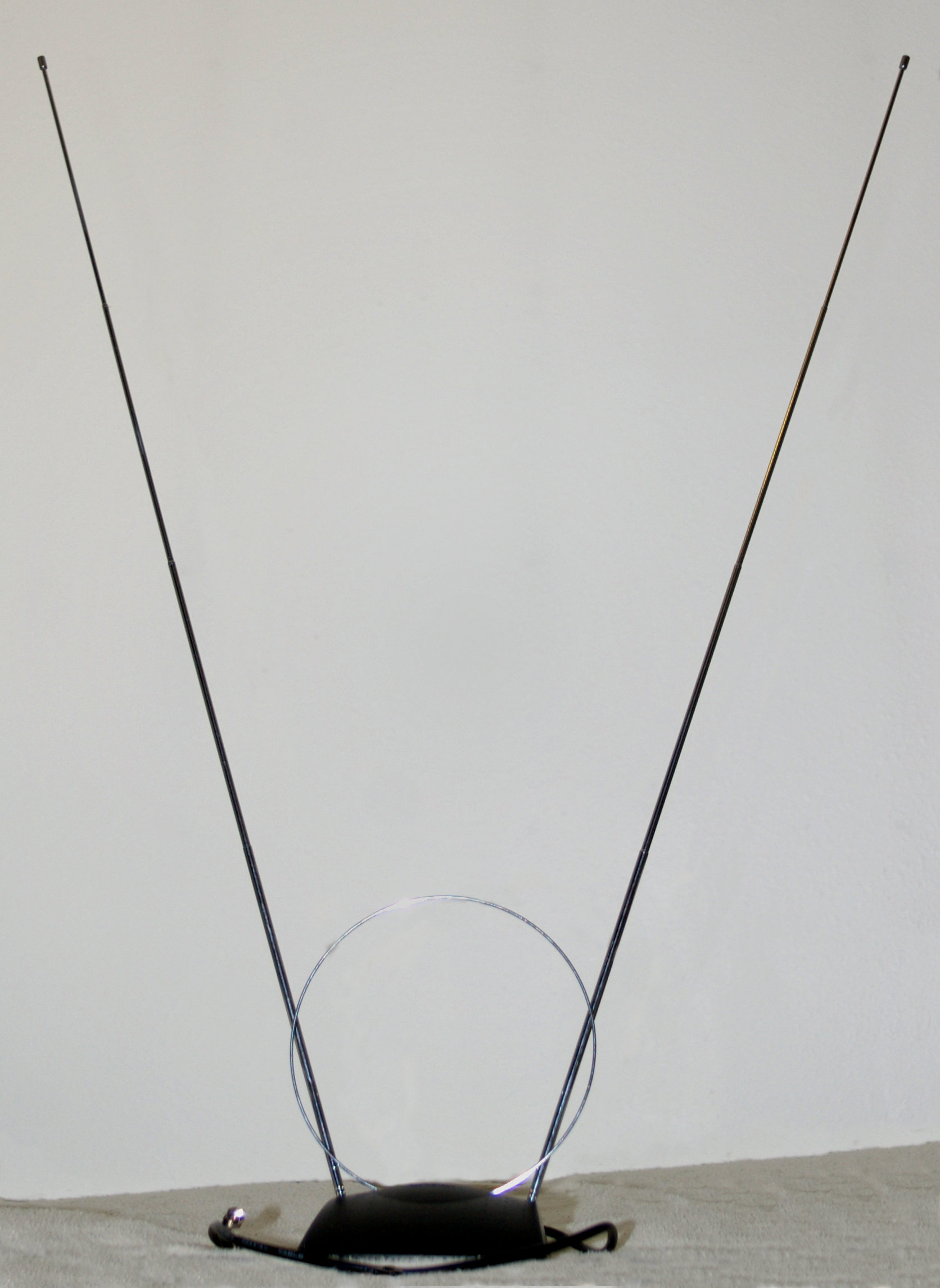
A rabbit ears indoor antenna. This model also has a loop antenna for UHF reception.

A television antenna, also called a television aerial (in British English), is an antenna specifically designed for use with a television receiver (TV) to receive terrestrial over-the-air (OTA) broadcast television signals from a television station. Terrestrial television is broadcast on frequencies from about 47 to 250 MHz in the very high frequency (VHF) band, and 470 to 960 MHz in the ultra high frequency (UHF) band in different countries.

Television antennas are manufactured in two different types: indoor and outdoor antennas. Indoor antennas are designed to be located on top of or next to the television set, but are ideally placed near a window in a room and as high up as possible for the best reception. The most common types of indoor antennas are the dipole ("rabbit ears"), which work best for VHF channels, and loop antennas, which work best for UHF. Outdoor antennas on the other hand are designed to be mounted on a mast on top of the owner's house, or in a loft or attic where the dry conditions and increased elevation are advantageous for reception and antenna longevity. Outdoor antennas are more expensive and difficult to install but are necessary for adequate reception in fringe areas far from television stations; the most common types of these are the Yagi, log periodic, and (for UHF) the multi-bay reflective array antenna.

== Description ==
The purpose of the antenna is to intercept radio waves from the desired television stations and convert them to tiny radio frequency alternating currents which are applied to the television's tuner, which extracts the television signal. The antenna is connected to the television with a specialized cable designed to carry radio current, called transmission line. Earlier antennas used a flat cable called 300 ohm twin-lead. The standard today is 75 ohm coaxial cable, which is less susceptible to interference which plugs into an F connector or Belling-Lee connector (depending on region) on the back of the TV. To convert the signal from antennas that use a twin-lead line to the modern coaxial cable input, a small transformer called a balun is used in the line.

In most countries, television broadcasting is allowed in the very high frequency (VHF) band from 47 to 68 MHz, called VHF low band or band I in Europe; 174 to 216 MHz, called VHF high band or band III in Europe, and in the ultra high frequency (UHF) band from 470 to 698 MHz, called band IV and V in Europe. The boundaries of each band vary somewhat in different countries. Radio waves in these bands travel by line-of-sight; they are blocked by hills and the visual horizon, limiting a television station's reception area to 65–95 km (40–60 miles), depending on terrain.

=== Analog vs. digital ===
In the previous standard analog television, used before 2006, the VHF and UHF bands required separate tuners in the television receiver, which had separate antenna inputs. The wavelength of a radio wave equals the speed of light (c), divided by the frequency. The above frequency bands cover a 15:1 wavelength ratio, or almost 4 octaves. It is difficult to design a single antenna to receive such a wide wavelength range, and there is an octave gap from 216 to 470 MHz between the VHF and UHF frequencies. So traditionally, separate antennas (outdoor antennas with separate sets of elements on a single support boom) have been used to receive the VHF and UHF channels.

Starting in 2006, many countries in the world switched from broadcasting using an older analog television standard to newer digital television (DTV). However, the same broadcast frequencies are generally used, so the antennas used for the older analog television will also receive the new DTV broadcasts. Sellers often claim to supply a special digital or high-definition television (HDTV) antenna advised as a replacement for an existing analog television antenna; at best this is misinformation to generate sales of unneeded equipment, At worst, it may leave the viewer with a UHF-only antenna in a local market (particularly in North America) where some digital stations remain on their original high VHF or low VHF frequencies.

=== Reception issues ===
West-German TV penetration in East Germany.

Places unable to be reached by television broadcast transmitters are known as black spots in Australia. In East Germany, the areas that could not receive western TV signals were referred to as the Tal der Ahnungslosen, or Valley of the Clueless.

== Indoor ==
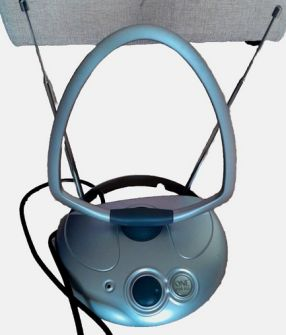
A loop antenna for UHF reception. This model also has two telescopic poles for VHF. It also has a mains-powered amplifier to improve signal strength.

Indoor antennas may be mounted on the television itself or stand on a table next to it, connected to the television by a short feed line. Due to space constraints, indoor antennas cannot be as large and elaborate as outdoor antennas, they are not mounted at as high an elevation, and the building walls block some of the radio waves; for these reasons, indoor antennas generally do not give as good reception as outdoor antennas. They are often perfectly adequate in urban and suburban areas, which are usually within the strong radiation footprint of local television stations. Still, in rural fringe reception areas, only an outdoor antenna may give adequate reception. A few of the simplest indoor antennas are described below, but a great variety of designs and types exist. Many have a dial on the antenna with a number of different settings to alter the antenna's reception pattern. This should be rotated with the set on while looking at the screen until the best picture is obtained.

=== Rabbit ears ===
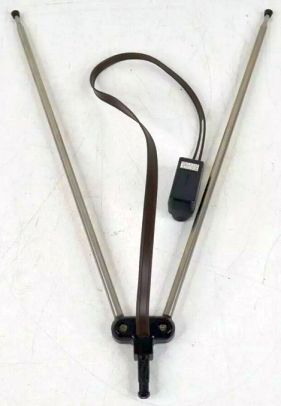
The 'rabbit ears' antenna with its coaxial plug

The oldest and most widely used (at least in the United States) indoor antenna is the rabbit ears or bunny ears, which are often provided with new television sets. It is a simple half-wave dipole antenna used to receive the VHF television bands, consisting in the US of 54 to 88 MHz (band I) and 174 to 216 MHz (band III), with wavelengths of 5.5 to 1.4 m (18 to 5 feet). It is constructed of two telescoping rods attached to a base, which extend out to about 1 m (3.3 feet) length (approximately one-quarter wavelength at 54 MHz) and can be collapsed when not in use. For best reception, the rods should be adjusted to be a little less than 1/4 wavelength at the frequency of the television channel being received. However, the dipole has a wide bandwidth, so often adequate reception is achieved without adjusting the length.

The measured gain of rabbit ears is low, about ―2 dBi, or ―4 dB with respect to a half wave dipole. This means it is not as directional and sensitive to distant stations as a large rooftop antenna. Still, its wide-angle reception pattern may allow it to receive several stations located in different directions without requiring readjustment when the channel is changed. Dipole antennas are bi-directional; that is, they have two main lobes in opposite directions, 180° apart. Instead of being fixed in position like other antennas, the elements are mounted on ball-and-socket joints. They can be adjusted to various angles in a V shape, allowing them to be moved out of the way in crowded quarters. Another reason for the V shape is that when receiving channels at the top of the band with the rods fully extended, the antenna elements will typically resonate at their 3rd harmonic. In this mode, the direction of maximum gain (the main lobe) is no longer perpendicular to the rods. Still, the radiation pattern will have lobes at an angle to the rods, making it advantageous to be able to adjust them to various angles.

=== Whip antenna ===
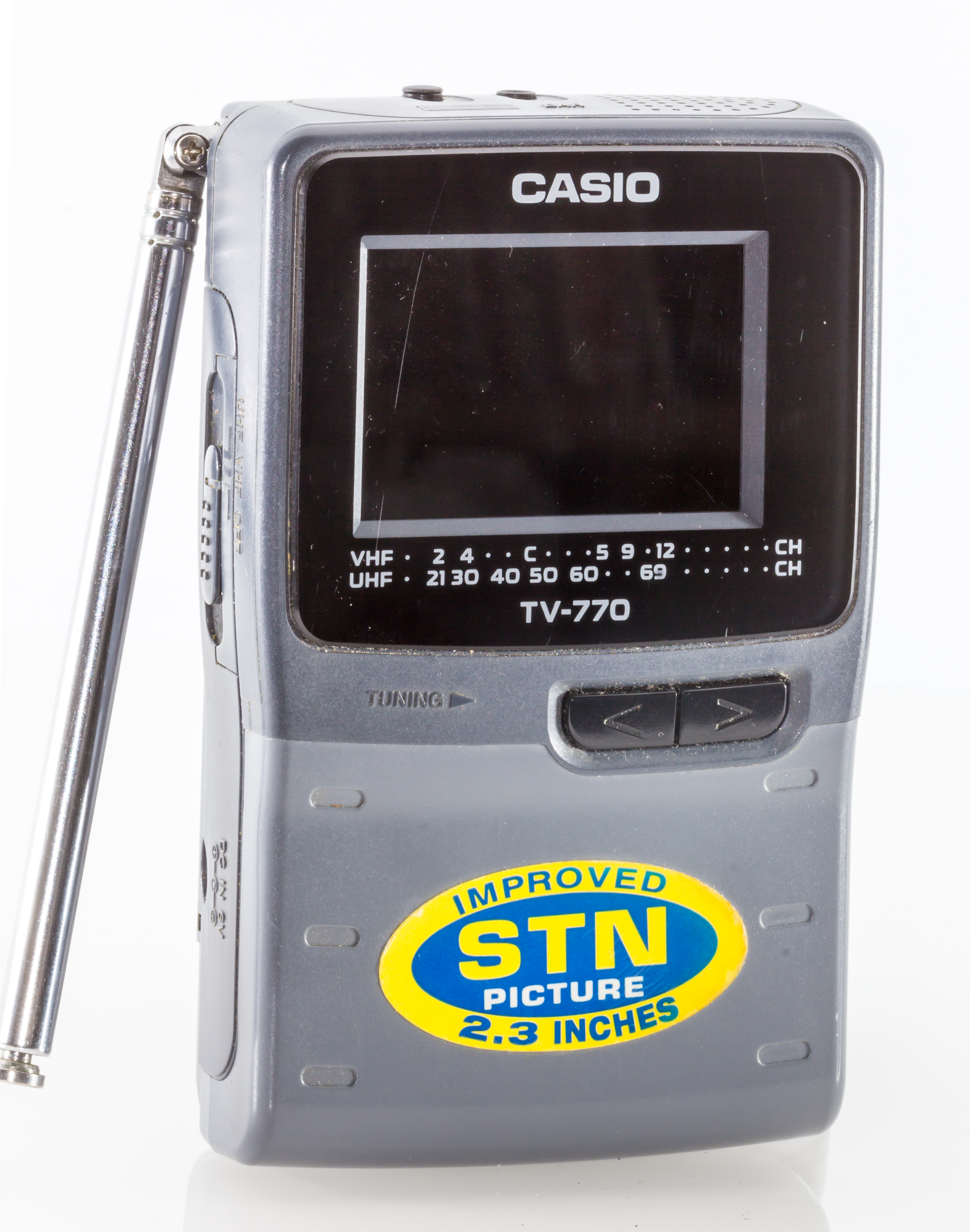
A 'whip' antenna at the side of a Casio portable TV

Some portable televisions use a whip antenna. This consists of a single telescoping rod about a meter (3.3 feet) long attached to the television, which can be retracted when not in use. It functions as a quarter-wave monopole antenna. The other side of the feedline is connected to the ground plane on the TV's circuit board, which acts as ground. The whip antenna generally has an omnidirectional reception pattern, with maximum sensitivity in directions perpendicular to the antenna axis and gain similar to rabbit ears.

=== Loop antenna ===
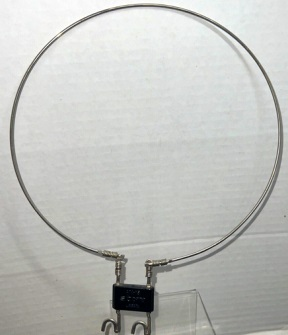
A simple wire loop antenna

The UHF channels are often received by a single turn loop antenna. Since a rabbit ears antenna only covers the VHF bands, it is often combined with a UHF loop mounted on the same base to cover all the TV channels. This of course also depends by country and region: for example in the UK and Ireland, terrestrial TV broadcasts are only on the UHF band, meaning that a loop antenna is necessary and the rabbit ears would only be useful for FM radio reception.

=== Flat antenna ===
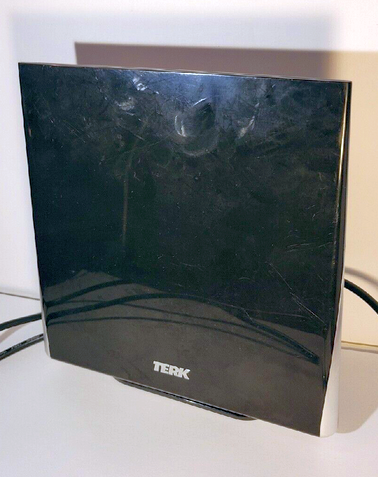
A flat antenna

A more recent phenomenon for indoor antennas are flat antennas, which are lightweight, thin, and usually square-shaped with the claim of having more omnidirectional reception. They are also marketed as being more in line with modern minimalistic home designs. Flat antennas may have a stand or could be hung on a wall or a window. Internally, the thin, flat square is a loop antenna with its circular metallic wiring embedded into conductive plastic.

== Outdoor ==
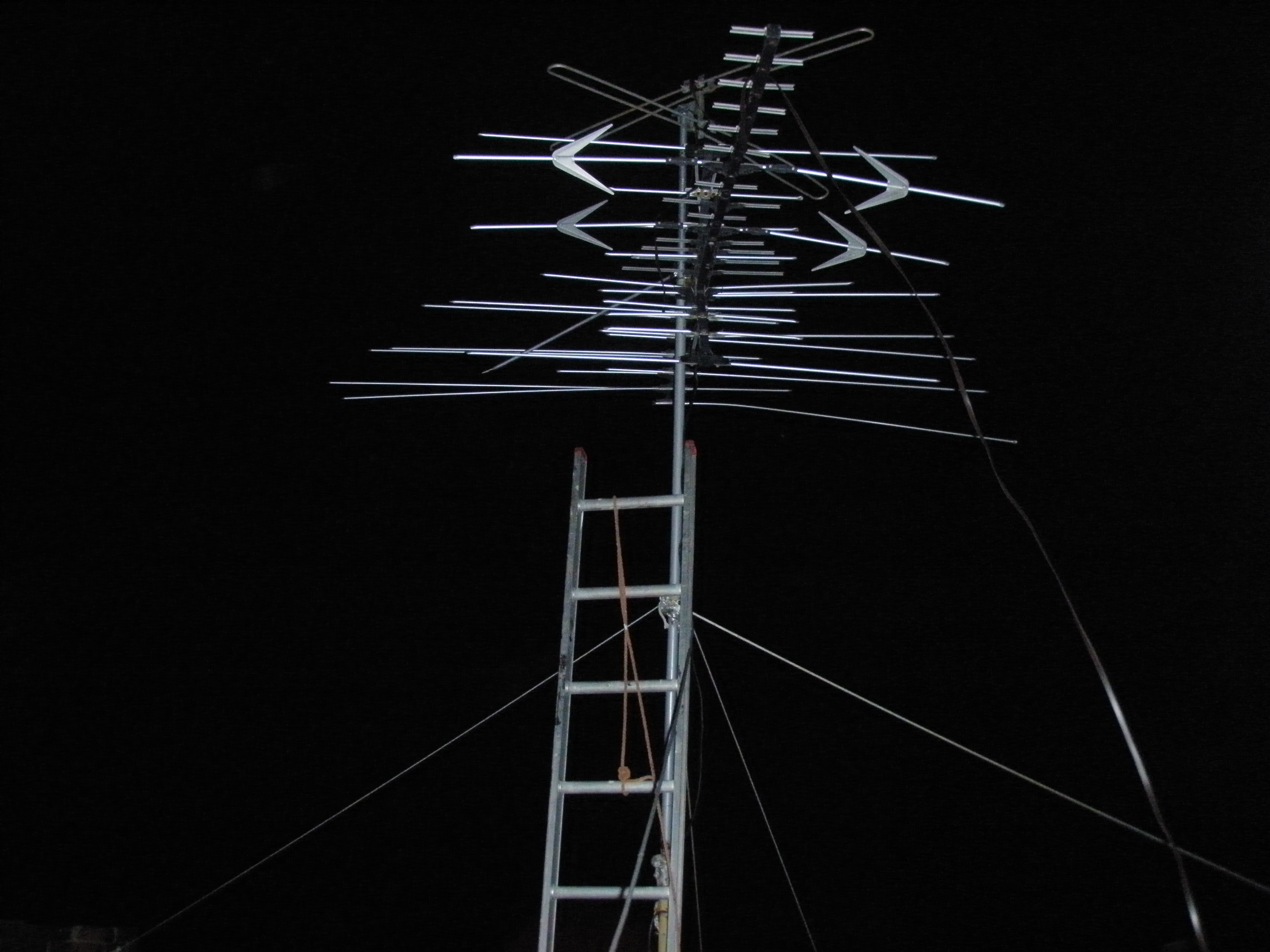
A Winegard 68 element VHF/UHF aerial antenna. This common multi-band antenna type uses a UHF Yagi at the front and a VHF log-periodic at the back coupled together.

When a higher-gain antenna is needed to achieve adequate reception in suburban or fringe reception areas, an outdoor directional antenna is usually used. Although most simple antennas have null directions where they have zero response, the directions of useful gain are very broad. In contrast, directional antennas can have an almost unidirectional radiation pattern, so the correct end of the antenna must be pointed at the TV station. As an antenna design provides higher gain (compared to a dipole), the main lobe of the radiation pattern becomes narrower. Outdoor antennas provide up to a 15 dB gain in signal strength and 15-20 dB greater rejection of ghost signals in analog TV. Combined with a signal increase of 14 dB due to height and 11 dB due to lack of attenuating building walls, an outdoor antenna can result in a signal strength increase of up to 40 dB at the TV receiver.

Outdoor antenna designs are often based on the Yagi–Uda antenna or log-periodic dipole array (LPDA). These are composed of multiple half-wave dipole elements, consisting of metal rods approximately half of the wavelength of the television signal, mounted in a line on a support boom. These act as resonators; the electric field of the incoming radio wave pushes the electrons in the rods back and forth, creating standing waves of oscillating voltage in the rods. The antenna can have a smaller or larger number of rod elements; in general, the more elements, the higher the gain and the more directional. Another design used mainly for UHF reception is the reflective array antenna, consisting of a vertical metal screen with multiple dipole elements mounted in front of it.

The television broadcast bands are too wide in frequency to be covered by a single antenna, so the two options are separate antennas used for the VHF and UHF bands or a combination (combo) VHF/UHF antenna. A VHF/UHF antenna combines two antennas feeding the same feedline mounted on the same support boom. More extended elements that pick up VHF frequencies are located at the back of the boom and often function as a log-periodic antenna. Shorter elements that receive the UHF stations are located at the front of the boom and often function as a Yagi antenna.

Since directional antennas must be pointed at the transmitting antenna, this is a problem when the television stations to be received are located in different directions. In this case, two or more directional rooftop antennas, each pointed at a different transmitter, are often mounted on the same mast and connected to one receiver for best performance filter or matching circuits are used to keep each antenna from degrading the performance of the others connected to the same transmission line. An alternative is to use a single antenna mounted on a rotator, a remote servo system that rotates the antenna to a new direction when a dial next to the television is turned.

Sometimes television transmitters are deliberately located such that receivers in a given region need only receive transmissions in a relatively narrow band of the full UHF television spectrum and from the same direction, hence allowing the use of a higher gain grouped aerial.

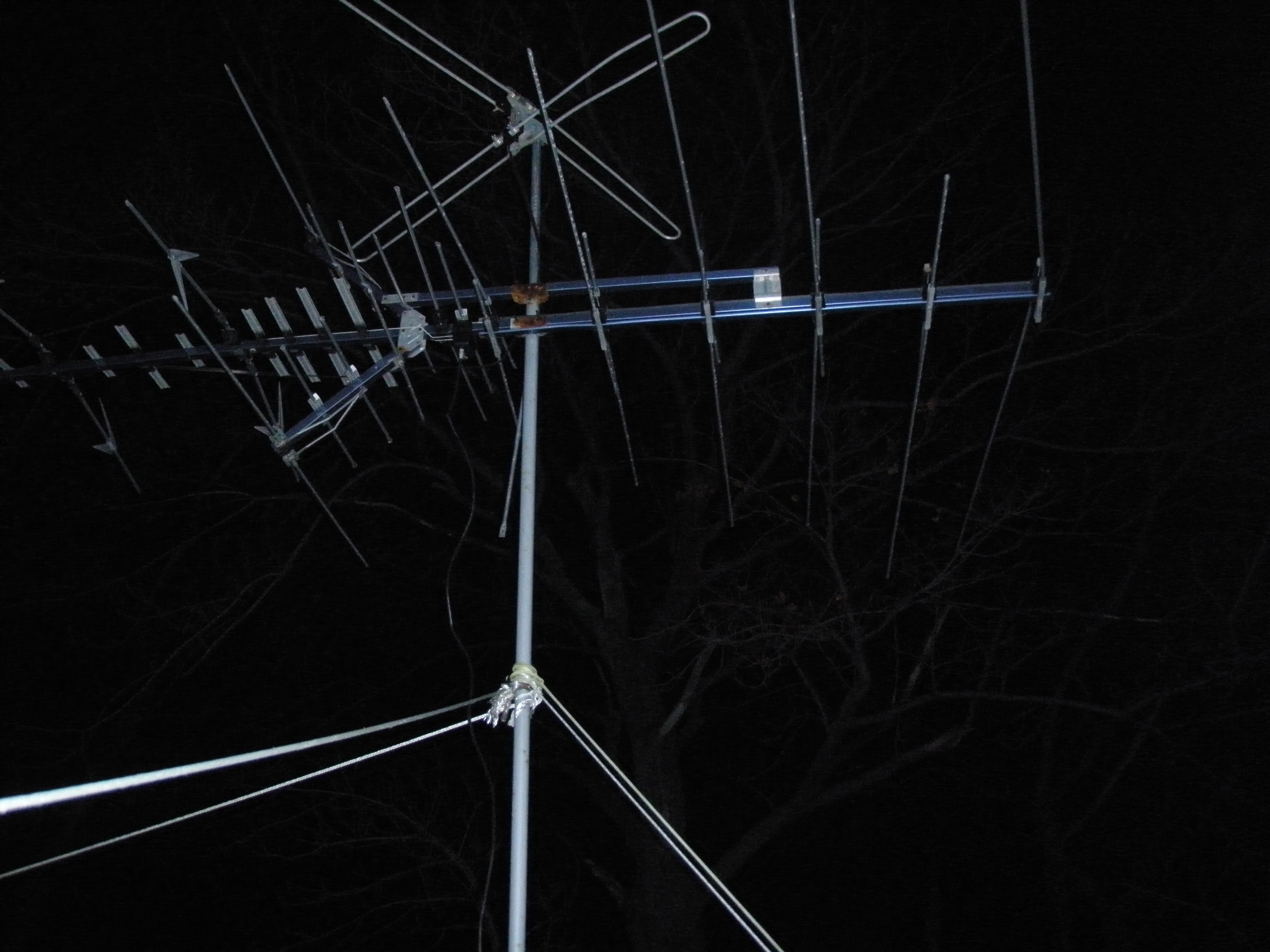

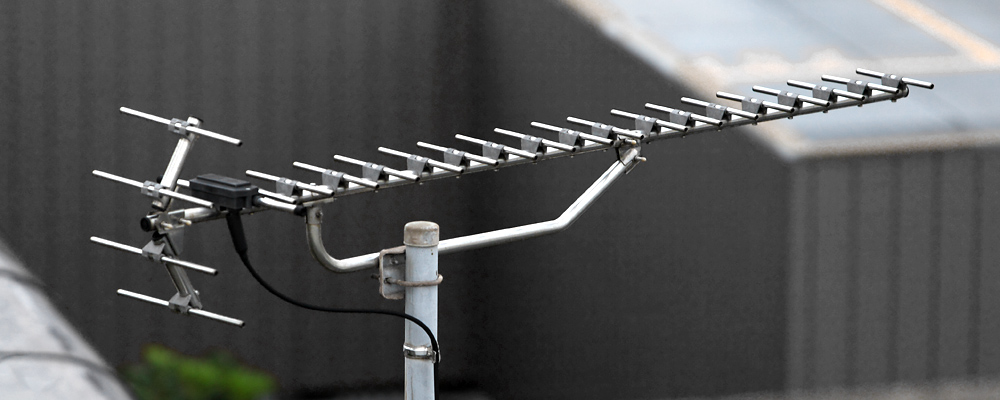
A UHF television antenna

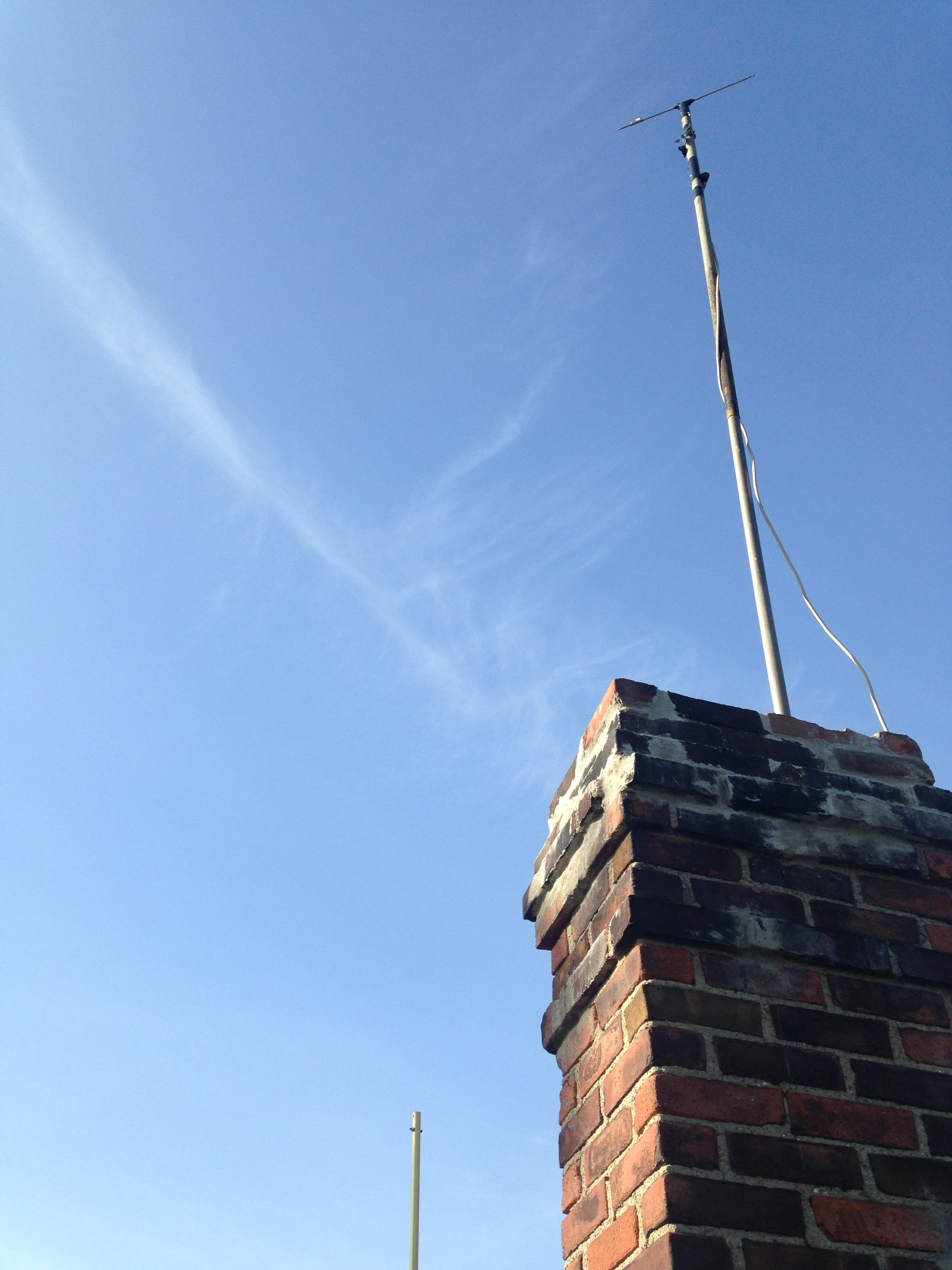
A rabbit ear indoor antenna weatherproofed and installed outdoors

== Installation ==
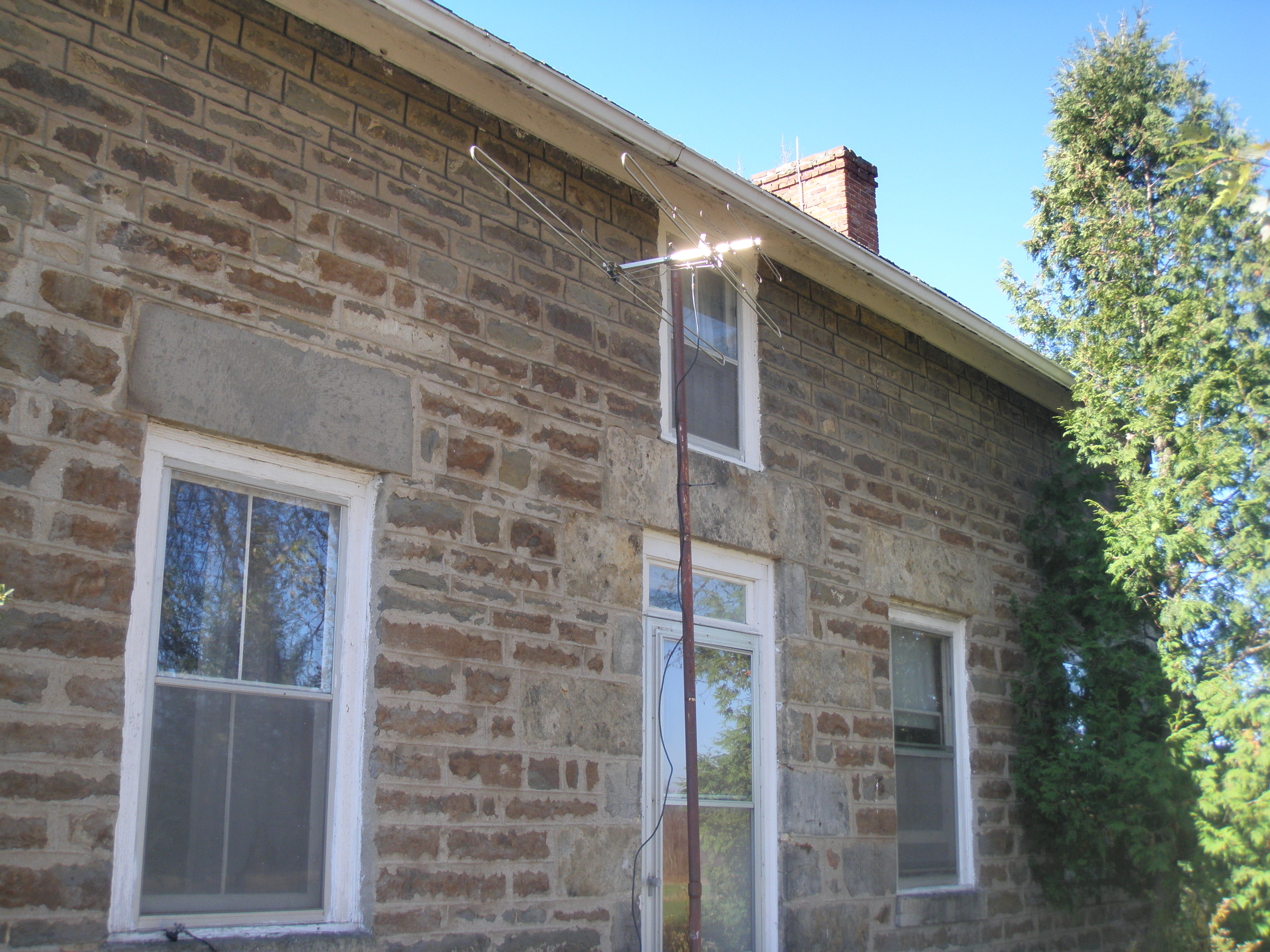
A short antenna pole next to a house

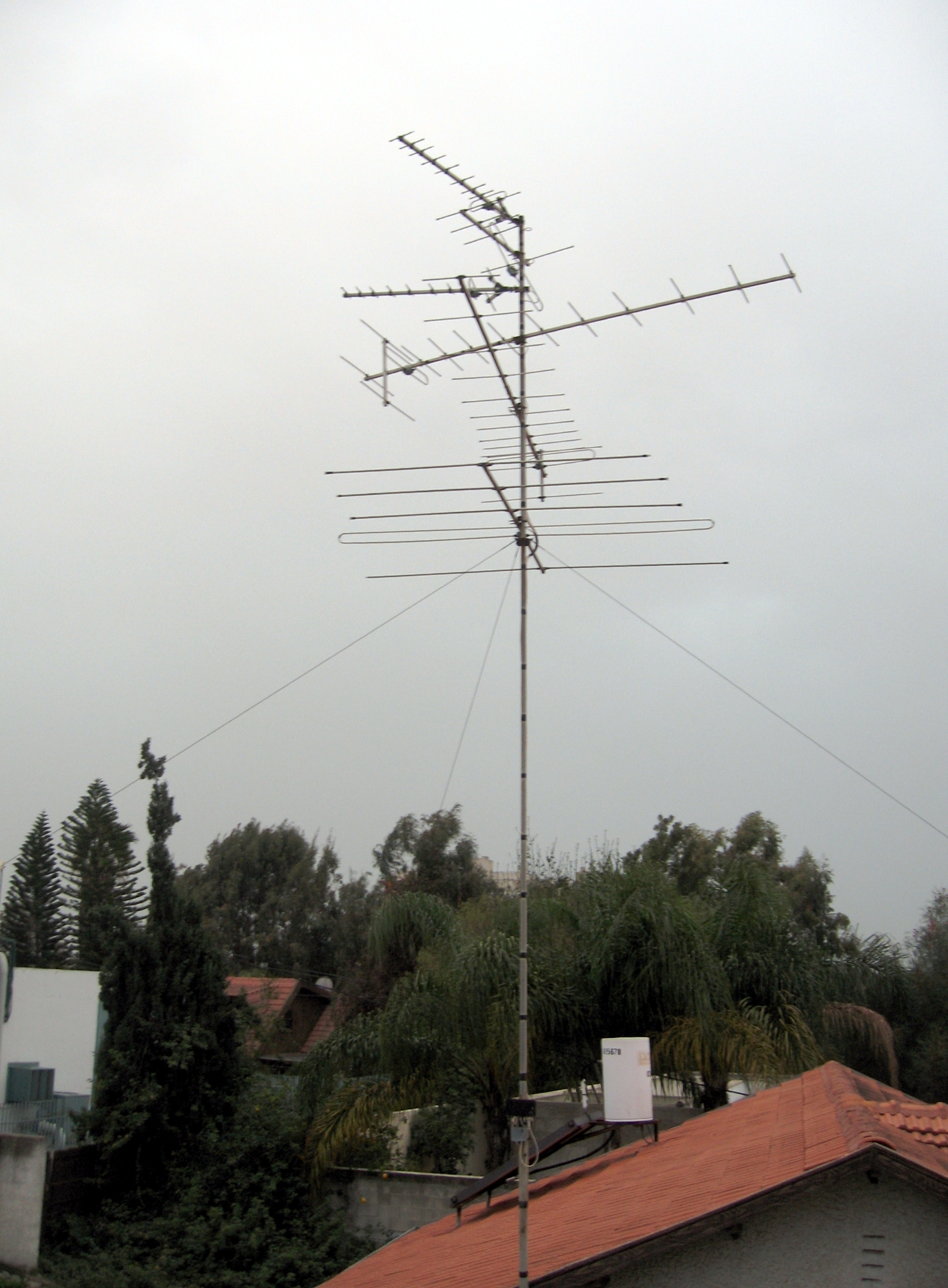
Multiple Yagi TV aerials

Antennas are commonly placed on rooftops and sometimes in attics. Placing an antenna indoors significantly attenuates the level of the available signal. Directional antennas must be pointed at the transmitter they are receiving; in most cases great accuracy is not needed. In a given region, it is sometimes arranged that all television transmitters are located in roughly the same direction and use frequencies spaced closely enough that a single antenna suffices for all. A single transmitter location may transmit signals for several channels. CABD (communal antenna broadcast distribution) is a system installed inside a building to receive free-to-air TV/FM signals transmitted via radio frequencies and distribute them to the audience.

Analog television signals are susceptible to ghosting in the image, multiple closely spaced images giving the impression of blurred and repeated images of edges in the picture. This is due to the signal being reflected from nearby objects (buildings, trees, mountains); several copies of the signal, of different strengths and subject to different delays, are picked up. This is different for other transmissions. Careful positioning of the antenna can produce a compromise position, which minimizes the ghosts on different channels. Ghosting is also possible if multiple antennas connected to the same receiver pick up the same station, especially if the lengths of the cables connecting them to the splitter/merger are different lengths or the antennas are too close together. Analog television is being replaced by digital, which is not subject to ghosting; the same reflected signal that causes ghosting in an analog signal would produce no viewable content at all in digital. However, in this case, interference causes significantly more significant image quality degradation.

=== Rooftop and other outdoor antennas ===
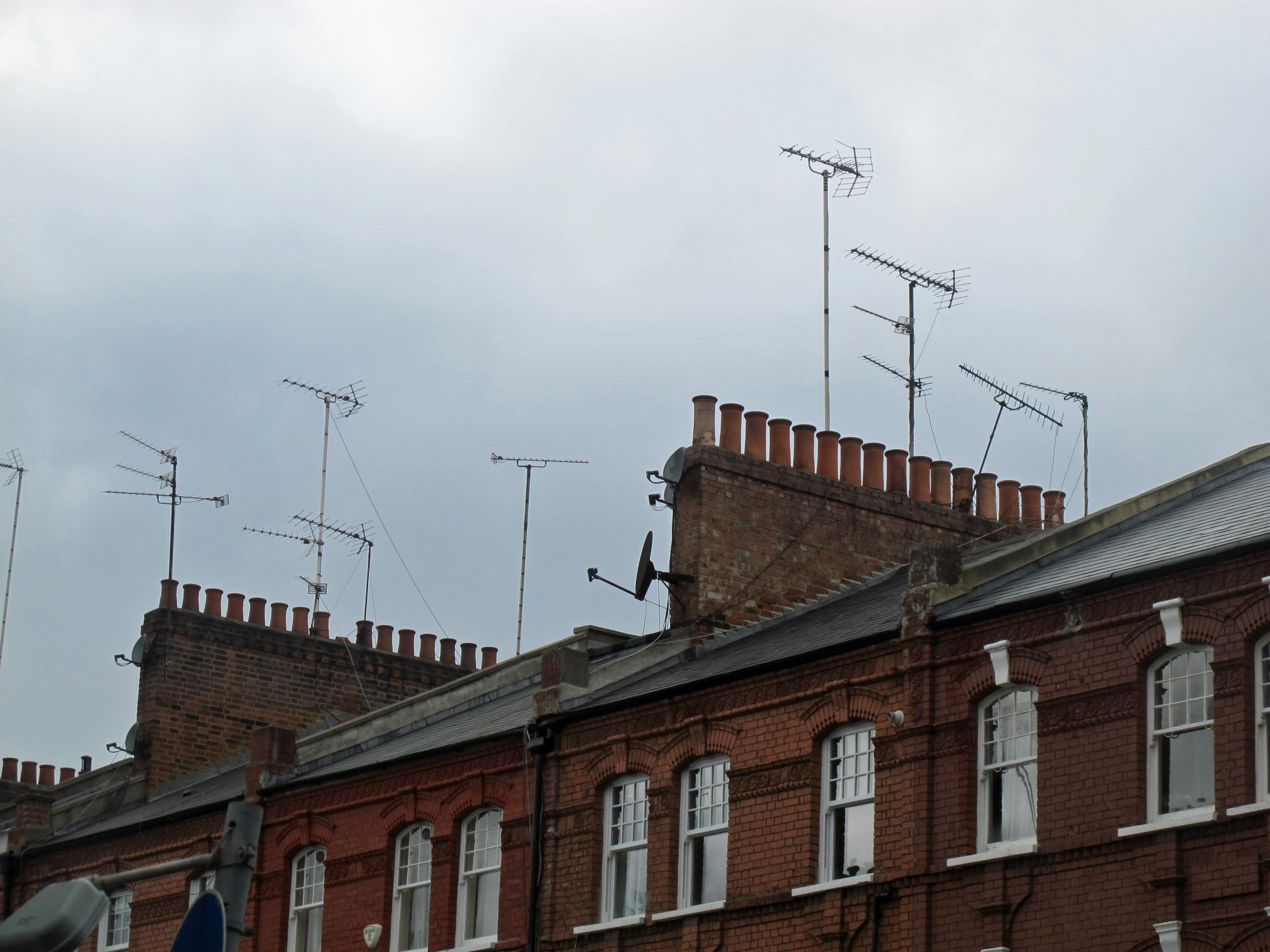
Aerials mounted on the rooftops of houses in England

Aerials are attached to roofs in various ways, usually on a pole to elevate it above the roof. This is generally sufficient in most areas. In some places, however, such as a deep valley or near taller structures, the antenna may need to be placed significantly higher, using a guyed mast or mast. The wire connecting the antenna indoors is referred to as the downlead or drop, and the longer the downlead is, the greater the signal degradation in the wire. Certain cables may help reduce this tendency.

The higher the antenna is placed, the better it will perform. An antenna of higher gain will be able to receive weaker signals from its preferred direction. Intervening buildings, topographical features (mountains), and dense forests will weaken the signal; in many cases, the signal will be reflected such that a usable signal is still available. There are physical dangers inherent to high or complex antennas, such as the structure falling or being destroyed by weather. There are also varying local ordinances which restrict and limit such things as the height of a structure without obtaining permits. For example, in the United States, the Telecommunications Act of 1996 (Over-the-Air Reception Devices OTARD Rule) allows "any owner or a tenant" the right, "on property that they own or over which they have exclusive use or control", to install "An antenna that is designed to receive local television broadcast signals" but that "masts higher than 12 feet [3.5 m] above the roof-line may be subject to local permitting requirements."

=== Indoor antennas ===
As discussed previously, antennas may be placed indoors where signals are strong enough to overcome antenna shortcomings. The antenna is simply plugged into the television receiver and placed conveniently, often on the top of the receiver ("set-top"). Sometimes, the position needs to be experimented with to get the best picture. Indoor antennas can also benefit from RF amplification, commonly called a TV booster. Reception from indoor antennas can be problematic in weak signal areas.

=== Attic installation ===
Sometimes, it is desirable not to put an antenna on the roof; in these cases, antennas designed for outdoor use are often mounted in the attic or loft, although antennas designed for attic use are also available. Putting an antenna indoors significantly decreases its performance due to lower elevation above ground level and intervening walls; however, in strong signal areas, reception may be satisfactory. One layer of asphalt shingles, roof felt, and a plywood roof deck is considered to attenuate the signal to about half.

=== Multiple antennas, rotators ===
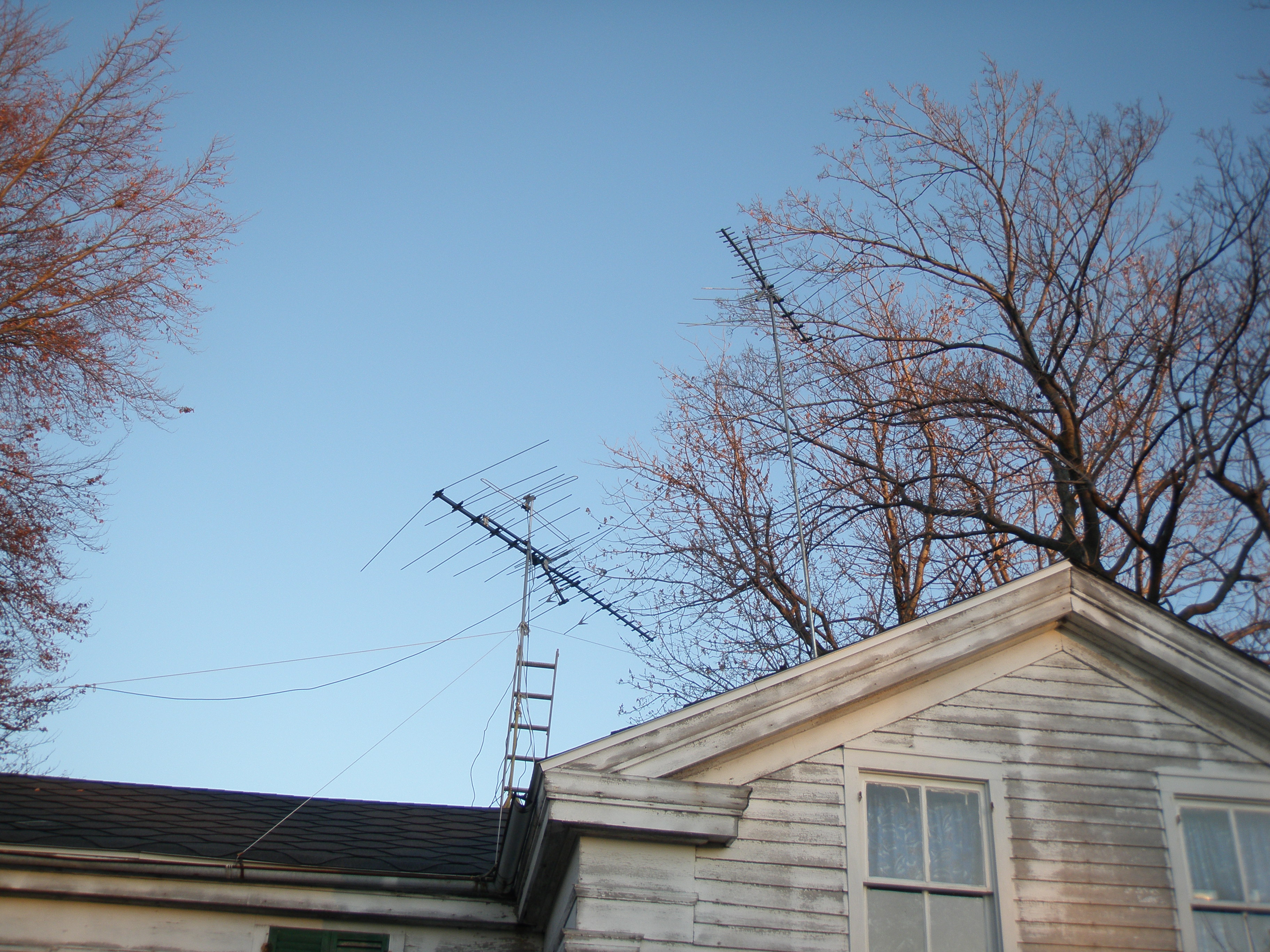
Two aerials set up on a roof. Spaced horizontally and vertically

It is sometimes desired to receive signals from transmitters which are not in the same direction. This can be achieved, for one station at a time, by using a rotator operated by an electric motor to turn the antenna as desired. Alternatively, two or more antennas, each pointing at a desired transmitter and coupled by appropriate circuitry, can be used. To prevent the antennas from interfering with each other, the vertical spacing between the booms must be at least half the wavelength of the lowest frequency to be received (Distance = λ/2). The wavelength of 54 MHz (Channel 2) is 5.5 m (18 feet) (λ × f = c) so the antennas must be a minimum of 2.25 m (90 inches) apart. It is also important that the cables connecting the antennas to the signal splitter/merger be precisely the same length to prevent phasing issues, which cause ghosting with analog reception. That is, the antennas might both pick up the same station; the signal from the one with the shorter cable will reach the receiver slightly sooner, supplying the receiver with two pictures slightly offset. There may be phasing issues even with the same length of down-lead cable. Band-pass filters or signal traps may help to reduce this problem.

For side-by-side placement of multiple antennas, as is common in a space of limited height such as an attic, they should be separated by at least one full wavelength of the lowest frequency to be received at their closest point.

When multiple antennas are often used, one is for a range of co-located stations, and the other is for a single transmitter in a different direction.

=== Safety ===
- TV antennas are good conductors of electricity and attract lightning, acting as a lightning rod. A lightning arrester is usually used to protect against this. A large grounding rod connected to both the antenna and the mast or pole is required.
- Properly installed masts, especially tall ones, are guyed with galvanized cable; no insulators are needed. They are designed to withstand worst-case weather conditions in the area and are positioned so that they do not interfere with power lines if they fall.
- There is an inherent danger in being on the rooftop of a house, required for installing or adjusting a television antenna.

== See also ==
- Broadcast television systems
- Radio masts and towers, sometimes called Radio and TV antennas
- Satellite dish
- Satellite television
- Terrestrial television
