= Channel number =

Channel number may refer to:

- A television channel number
  - Virtual channel numbers, as used on digital television systems
- Wireless LAN channel numbers, see list of WLAN channels
- Absolute radio-frequency channel number for GSM cellular networks

== See also ==
- Pan-American television frequencies
- European cable television frequencies
- Australian and New Zealand television frequencies
- List of channel numbers assigned to FM frequencies in North America
