= Superband =

Superband may refer to:

- Supergroup (music), a term describing a rock music group formed by performers who are already notable
- Superband (band), a Mandopop band from Taiwan
- Superband (TV program), a 2019 Korean music competition show on JTBC
- SuperBand, a TV spinoff of a popular singing talent-search competition in Singapore from 2006–2008
- Superband, a 1960s American rock group formed by Jimmy Greenspoon
- Cable television frequency band (Europe, North America)
