= Australian and New Zealand television frequencies =

Television frequency allocation has evolved since the start of television in Australia in 1956, and later in New Zealand in 1960. There was no coordination between the national spectrum management authorities in either country to establish the frequency allocations. The management of the spectrum in both countries is largely the product of their economical and political situation.

The demand and planning for television in Australia intensified after WW2, with the Chifley government first favouring the existing British model (state monopoly) in 1948, and New Zealand used a similar model during the introduction of television in the 1960s. Private broadcasting did not come to the country until the 1980s, but there was no spectrum expansion to cope with the new arrangement.

== History ==
=== Australia ===
Australian television broadcasting commenced in 1956 in Melbourne and Sydney to coincide with the 1956 Summer Olympics.

Three stations commenced operations on a ten-channel spectrum arrangement: the ABC operating in the VHF low band (VHF Ch 2), and the commercial stations operating in the VHF high band (VHF Ch 7 & 9). At the outset, commercial stations were independently owned, but due to economic forces network affiliations were soon established.

This pattern of television spectrum allocation was replicated in most of the state capital cities over the subsequent decade, with the exception of Hobart (one commercial service on VHF 6) and eventually Darwin (both the ABC and the commercial service were allocated in the VHF high band).

Geographical conditions differed in Melbourne and Sydney. The Melbourne transmission towers were located on the nearby Mount Dandenong, and their elevation and broadcasting power on an otherwise relatively flat terrain meant that the broadcasting signal could be received for some considerable distance, although there were some areas that experienced reception difficulties due to hills or buildings.

In the Sydney "basin" (formed by the Blue Mountains to the west and the Southern Highlands to the south and south-west) the broadcast towers were collocated on the original studio sites, and given the undulating geography of Sydney there were many areas that experienced reception difficulties. The Blue Mountain terrain in the West of Sydney meant that capital city broadcasting did not penetrate into the hinterland of NSW, unlike that of Melbourne. It is possible that the penetration of weak signals into the Victorian hinterlands hastened the demand for the establishment of regional television stations, which commenced in 1961.

The Australian Government restricted regional television broadcasting to one commercial service and a repeater station of the national broadcaster from the capital city ABC station. Regional television stations tended to be allocated to VHF 6, 8 or in some cases 10.

=== New Zealand ===
New Zealand television broadcasting began in 1960 in Auckland, followed by Wellington and Christchurch in 1961, and Dunedin in 1962. Initially, each centre had only one television channel, with the four stations linked into a network in 1969. In 1975, a reorganisation merged the four channels into a single network, TV One, while a second network, TV2, was launched later that year.

The initial four stations were allocated channels within the three-channel VHF low band according to local terrain and propagation characteristics. Christchurch, regarded as almost ideal for television broadcasting because of its relatively flat terrain, was allocated Channel 3 (61–68 MHz). Lower frequencies were better able to curve around obstructions, so Auckland and Dunedin were allocated Channel 2 (54–61 MHz), while Wellington, with the most difficult terrain, used Channel 1 (44–51 MHz).

Afterwards, channel allocation on the VHF bands in New Zealand was rather haphazard. Originally, only channels 1 through 9 were used; channels 10 and 11 were added in the 1980s. Due to this artifact, TV One and TV2 largely used channels 1 through 9 while channels 10 and 11 were almost the exclusive domain of TV3 (launched 1989) and TV4 (launched 1997). One major exception to this was in Canterbury, where in the late 1980s several translators moved TV One or TV2 from channel 6 to channel 10 to allow the main Sugarloaf transmitter to broadcast TV3 on channel 6.

Meanwhile, the allocation of the UHF band was much more organised. When originally allocated in 1989, each area was allocated UHF channels at four-channel (32 MHz) intervals. For example, Auckland was allocated channels 27, 31, 43, 47, etc., Wellington was allocated channels 28, 32, 44, 48, etc., and Christchurch was allocated channels 30, 34, 46, 50, etc. Infill channels were added at two-channel (16 MHz) intervals.

=== FM Broadcasting ===
New Zealand's original FM broadcasting allocation, when FM frequencies were first allocated around 1981 until 1986 was 89.0 to 94.0 MHz, and then from 1986, until 2000 was 89.0 to 100.0 MHz. Meanwhile, the segments of the band not used for FM broadcasting, such as the band above 100 MHz had been allocated to land-based AM mobile radio-telephone users (taxis, fire and others), an allocation that dates back to the late 1950s. Prior to the allocation of FM radio frequencies for broadcasting, the entire 88 to 108 MHz band was allocated to land mobile two way radio communications. New Zealand's FM frequency allocation issue was not fixed until the late 1990s, after those users had been progressively reassigned channels elsewhere, when the band was expanded to the full 20.5 MHz. New Zealand now uses the standard global allocation of 87.5–108 MHz for FM. Today, full-power FM stations use frequencies between 88.6 MHz and 106.5 MHz, although the band between 101.8 MHz and 103.3 MHz is allocated to future government, Maori and limited short term broadcasting, it is currently unused (as of February 2024). Low-power FM stations use frequencies from 87.6 MHz to 88.3 MHz and from 106.7 MHz to 107.7 MHz.

As of the mid-2010s television transmission in NZ totally abandoned its VHF band for UHF channels above 25. Unlike Australia, New Zealand did not assign television frequencies in what is now the FM broadcasting band.

== Differences in frequencies ==
There is a frequency offset for many DTV channels between Australia and NZ, because of historical reasons relating to the introduction of PAL.

- Both Australia and New Zealand use 7 MHz channel spacing (for PAL B) on VHF, but the frequencies and channel numbers differ substantially because of Australia revising its VHF TV band usage.
- Australia adopted Zweiton for stereophonic audio broadcasting, whilst NZ adopted NICAM.
- For PAL, the only difference is the placement of the NICAM carrier vs the Zweiton carrier, for broadcasters using NICAM. NZ used 5.824 MHz NICAM carrier offset, as used in mainland Europe.
- Australia's Zweiton offset was not changed with respect to the European standard.
- Australia, New Zealand, Fiji and Papua New Guinea have the same UHF band allocation for TV broadcasting.

=== Obsolete channels ===
- With the introduction of digital terrestrial television in Australia in 2001, channels 10 and 11 were moved up by 1 MHz.
  - This allocation change allowed a full 7 MHz for a new channel (9A).
  - VHF channel 12 was added following the new channel 11 to compensate for the change.
- channels 0-2 and 5A ceased to be used for television when analogue television broadcasting was discontinued. Channel 5A overlapped with frequencies reserved by the ITU for space research and VHF satellite downlink in the 137 MHz band.
- Television broadcasts on channels 3, 4, and 5 were previously discontinued in most regional areas in 1991 and 1992. Since the frequencies for these channels overlapped the range used for FM radio, any television broadcasts on these channels prevented the allocation of new FM radio licences, predominantly in regional areas.
- VHF Low Band DX using ITU TV Band (I) and part of Band (III) from NZ may disappear with the transition to DVB-T.

== Frequency allocation table ==
DVB-T channel allocation notes:

- The allocation for terrestrial television must be seen in terms of uniform system G 8 MHz blocks (for bands IV and V in NZ) and system B 7 MHz blocks (for bands I to V in Australia) after the cessation of analogue television.
- DVB-T, analogue systems B and G utilize the same 250 kHz guard-band.
- After analogue television transmissions have ceased, only the preferred main carrier wave centre frequency should be listed, because QAM modulates all AV channels and other data into a single H.222 data stream.
- Digital services on channels above Ch 51 are going to change channel after the analog services are switched off. The ACMA has published the pre-stack and post-stack channel in a spreadsheet on its website.
- Australian channel 12 was discontinued decades ago but is being reintroduced with digital television, generally for the ABC in the major metropolitan areas.
- A common problem (for metropolitan areas in particular) of difficulty receiving digital 10 (on channel 11) and digital ABC (on channel 12) is because older antennas were not designed to receive channels 11 and 12. Many VHF Band III antennas were only designed to receive channels 6 to 10 for analog television transmissions.
- Australia and New Zealand analog sub-carriers use the standard B/G offsets from the vision carrier.
  - PAL color difference at +4.43361875 MHz
  - FM monaural full mixed down channel audio at +5.5 MHz
  - New Zealand (B/G version) NICAM stereo or dual monaural at +5.824 MHz
  - Australian A2 Stereo right or second monaural channel at +5.742 MHz (AM signalling at +5.46875 MHz)

=== DTT allocation ===
NOTE: Text in italics means these frequencies are not currently used but set aside as a Guardband or for future use.

==== Very high frequency ====
| RF Band | Australia | | | | New Zealand | | | |
| RF Band | Channel No. | QAM Centre MHz | Vision Carrier MHz | FM Mono Audio Sub-Carrier MHz | Channel No. | QAM Centre MHz | Vision Carrier MHz | FM Mono Audio Sub-Carrier MHz |
|---|---|---|---|---|---|---|---|---|
| Band I | 0 | Reallocated | 46.25 | 51.75 | 1 | Reallocated | 45.25 | 50.75 |
| Band I | 1 | Reallocated | 57.25 | 62.75 | 2 | Reallocated | 55.25 | 60.75 |
| Band I | 2 | Reallocated | 64.25 | 69.75 | 3 | Reallocated | 62.25 | 67.75 |
| Band II | 3 | FM radio (1975) | 86.25 | 91.75 | | FM radio | | |
| Band II | 4 | FM radio (1975) | 95.25 | 100.75 | | FM radio | | |
| Band II | 5 | FM radio (1975) | 102.25 | 107.75 | | FM radio | | |
| Band II | 5A | Reallocated | 138.25 | 143.75 | | | | |
| Band III | 6 | 177.5 | 175.25 | 180.75 | 4 | Reallocated | 175.25 | 180.75 |
| Band III | 7 | 184.5 | 182.25 | 187.75 | 5 | Reallocated | 182.25 | 187.75 |
| Band III | 8 | 191.5 | 189.25 | 194.75 | 6 | Reallocated | 189.25 | 194.75 |
| Band III | 9 | 198.5 | 196.25 | 201.75 | 7 | Reallocated | 196.25 | 201.75 |
| Band III | 9A | 205.5 | 203.25 | 208.75 | 8 | Reallocated | 203.25 | 208.75 |
| Band III | 10 | 212.5 | 210.25 | 215.75 | 9 | Reallocated | 210.25 | 215.75 |
| Band III | 11 | 219.5 | 217.25 | 222.75 | 10 | Reallocated | 217.25 | 222.75 |
| Band III | 12 | 226.5 | 224.25 | 229.75 | 11 | Reallocated | 224.25 | 229.75 |

==== UHF ====
| RF Band | RF Channel | Australia | | | New Zealand | | |
| RF Band | RF Channel | QAM Centre MHz | Vision Carrier MHz | FM Mono Audio Sub-Carrier MHz | QAM Centre MHz | Vision Carrier MHz | FM Mono Audio Sub-Carrier MHz |
|---|---|---|---|---|---|---|---|
| Band IV | 25 | | | | 506.00 | 503.25 | 508.75 |
| Band IV | 26 | | | | 514.00 | 511.25 | 516.75 |
| Band IV | 27 | | | | 522.00 | 519.25 | 524.75 |
| Band IV | 28 | 529.5 | 527.25 | 532.75 | 530.00 | 527.25 | 532.75 |
| Band IV | 29 | 536.5 | 534.25 | 539.75 | 538.00 | 535.25 | 540.75 |
| Band IV | 30 | 543.5 | 541.25 | 546.75 | 546.00 | 543.25 | 548.75 |
| Band IV | 31 | 550.5 | 548.25 | 553.75 | 554.00 | 551.25 | 556.75 |
| Band IV | 32 | 557.5 | 555.25 | 560.75 | 562.00 | 559.25 | 564.75 |
| Band IV | 33 | 564.5 | 562.25 | 567.75 | 570.00 | 567.25 | 572.75 |
| Band IV | 34 | 571.5 | 569.25 | 574.75 | 578.00 | 575.25 | 580.75 |
| Band IV | 35 | 578.5 | 576.25 | 581.75 | 586.00 | 583.25 | 588.75 |
| Band V | 36 | 585.5 | 583.25 | 588.75 | 594.00 | 591.25 | 596.75 |
| Band V | 37 | 592.5 | 590.25 | 595.75 | 602.00 | 599.25 | 602.75 |
| Band V | 38 | 599.5 | 597.25 | 602.75 | 610.00 | 607.25 | 612.75 |
| Band V | 39 | 606.5 | 604.25 | 609.75 | 618.00 | 615.25 | 620.75 |
| Band V | 40 | 613.5 | 611.25 | 616.75 | 626.00 | 623.25 | 628.75 |
| Band V | 41 | 620.5 | 618.25 | 623.75 | 634.00 | 631.25 | 636.75 |
| Band V | 42 | 627.5 | 625.25 | 630.75 | 642.00 | 639.25 | 644.75 |
| Band V | 43 | 634.5 | 632.25 | 637.75 | 650.00 | 647.25 | 652.75 |
| Band V | 44 | 641.5 | 639.25 | 644.75 | 658.00 | 655.25 | 660.75 |
| Band V | 45 | 648.5 | 646.25 | 651.75 | 666.00 | 663.25 | 668.75 |
| Band V | 46 | 655.5 | 653.25 | 658.75 | 674.00 | 671.25 | 676.75 |
| Band V | 47 | 662.5 | 660.25 | 665.75 | 682.00 | 679.25 | 684.75 |
| Band V | 48 | 669.5 | 667.25 | 672.75 | 690.00 | 687.25 | 692.75 |
| Band V | 49 | 676.5 | 674.25 | 679.75 | 698.00 | 695.25 | 700.75 |
| Band V | 50 | 683.5 | 681.25 | 686.75 | Reallocated | 703.25 | 708.75 |
| Band V | 51 | 690.5 | 688.25 | 693.75 | Reallocated | 711.25 | 716.75 |
| Band V | 52 | Reallocated | 695.25 | 700.75 | Reallocated | 719.25 | 724.75 |
| Band V | 53 | Reallocated | 702.25 | 707.75 | Reallocated | 727.25 | 732.75 |
| Band V | 54 | Reallocated | 709.25 | 714.75 | Reallocated | 735.25 | 740.75 |
| Band V | 55 | Reallocated | 716.25 | 721.75 | Reallocated | 743.25 | 748.75 |
| Band V | 56 | Reallocated | 723.25 | 728.75 | Reallocated | 751.25 | 756.75 |
| Band V | 57 | Reallocated | 730.25 | 735.75 | Reallocated | 759.25 | 764.75 |
| Band V | 58 | Reallocated | 737.25 | 742.75 | Reallocated | 767.25 | 772.75 |
| Band V | 59 | Reallocated | 744.25 | 749.75 | Reallocated | 775.25 | 780.75 |
| Band V | 60 | Reallocated | 751.25 | 756.75 | Reallocated | 783.25 | 788.75 |
| Band V | 61 | Reallocated | 758.25 | 763.75 | Reallocated | 791.25 | 796.75 |
| Band V | 62 | Reallocated | 765.25 | 770.75 | Reallocated | 799.25 | 804.75 |
| Band V | 63 | Reallocated | 772.25 | 777.75 | Reallocated | | |
| Band V | 64 | Reallocated | 779.25 | 784.75 | Reallocated | | |
| Band V | 65 | Reallocated | 786.25 | 791.75 | Reallocated | | |
| Band V | 66 | Reallocated | 793.25 | 798.75 | Reallocated | | |
| Band V | 67 | Reallocated | 800.25 | 805.75 | Reallocated | | |
| Band V | 68 | Reallocated | 807.25 | 812.75 | Reallocated | | |
| Band V | 69 | Reallocated | 814.25 | 819.75 | Reallocated | | |

External Data is from ACMA Register of Radiocommunications Licences –

== Australian frequencies ==
=== Channels according to State ===
| Channel | ACT | NSW | VIC | QLD | SA | TAS | WA | NT | Extra territorial* | Nationwide |
|---|---|---|---|---|---|---|---|---|---|---|
| 6 | 1 | 8 | 4 | 13 | 2 | 1 | 15 | 3 | 2 | 49 |
| 7 | 1 | 8 | 5 | 21 | 4 | 2 | 21 | 4 | 2 | 68 |
| 8 | 1 | 7 | 4 | 12 | 3 | 2 | 11 | 3 | 2 | 45 |
| 9 | | 1 | | 2 | | | 12 | | | 15 |
| 9A | | | | 1 | 1 | | 10 | 1 | | 13 |
| 10 | | 4 | 3 | 5 | | 2 | 18 | 3 | 2 | 37 |
| 11 | 1 | 8 | 5 | 12 | 3 | 2 | 15 | 2 | 2 | 50 |
| 12 | 1 | 7 | 4 | 9 | 2 | 1 | 17 | | | 41 |
| 28 | | 24 | 9 | 14 | 6 | 4 | 6 | 2 | | 65 |
| 29 | | 17 | 11 | 16 | 4 | 4 | 5 | 1 | | 58 |
| 30 | | 25 | 10 | 27 | 6 | 3 | 7 | 3 | | 81 |
| 31 | | 23 | 10 | 17 | 3 | 2 | 7 | 1 | | 63 |
| 32 | | 27 | 6 | 27 | 5 | 3 | 4 | 2 | | 74 |
| 33 | | 17 | 6 | 18 | 3 | 1 | 8 | 1 | | 54 |
| 34 | | 7 | 18 | 34 | 16 | 12 | 6 | 2 | 1 | 96 |
| 35 | 1 | 9 | 19 | 27 | 15 | 13 | 4 | 1 | 1 | 90 |
| 36 | 1 | 12 | 18 | 21 | 15 | 12 | 2 | 2 | 1 | 84 |
| 37 | 1 | 12 | 19 | 29 | 15 | 12 | 4 | | 1 | 93 |
| 38 | 1 | 11 | 19 | 28 | 4 | 3 | 2 | 3 | 1 | 72 |
| 39 | 1 | 11 | 2 | 19 | 11 | 9 | 3 | | | 56 |
| 40 | | 45 | 20 | 40 | 4 | 5 | 15 | 5 | 2 | 136 |
| 41 | 2 | 51 | 26 | 44 | 11 | 8 | 17 | 4 | 2 | 165 |
| 42 | 1 | 52 | 17 | 49 | 11 | 8 | 19 | 5 | 2 | 164 |
| 43 | 1 | 52 | 24 | 40 | 10 | 8 | 15 | 3 | 2 | 155 |
| 44 | 1 | 50 | 23 | 50 | 12 | 7 | 18 | 4 | 2 | 167 |
| 45 | 2 | 14 | 11 | 24 | 10 | 5 | 7 | 1 | | 74 |
| 46 | | 31 | 25 | 46 | 9 | 10 | 20 | 1 | | 142 |
| 47 | | 33 | 27 | 42 | 11 | 15 | 15 | 1 | | 144 |
| 48 | | 32 | 25 | 41 | 11 | 12 | 21 | 1 | | 143 |
| 49 | | 31 | 26 | 38 | 9 | 10 | 17 | 1 | | 132 |
| 50 | | 31 | 24 | 32 | 9 | 7 | 18 | | | 121 |
| 51 | | 11 | 7 | 6 | 1 | 6 | 8 | | | 39 |
| 52 | | | | | | | | | | |
| 53 | | | | | | | | | | |
| 54 | | | | | | | | | | |
| 55 | | | 1 | | | | | | | 1 |
| 56 | | | | 1 | | | | | | 1 |
| 57 | | | | | | | | | | |
| 58 | | | | 1 | | | | | | 1 |
| 59 | | | | | | | | | | |
| 60 | | | | 3 | | | | | | 3 |
| 61 | | | | | | | | | | |
| 62 | | 2 | | | 1 | | | | | 3 |
| 63 | | 1 | | | | | | | | 1 |
| 64 | | | 1 | | | | | | | 1 |
| 65 | | | 1 | 1 | | | | | | 2 |
| 66 | | | | 2 | | | | | | 2 |
| 67 | | | | | | | | | | |
| 68 | | | | | | | | | | |
| 69 | | | | | | | | | | |
| Total | 17 | 674 | 430 | 812 | 227 | 189 | 367 | 60 | 25 | 2801 |

- The external territories include the Cocos Islands, Christmas Island & the Bayu-Undan Gas Project in the Timor Sea.

=== State-owned stations ===
The ABC has the highest number of transmission sites: often, but not always, SBS and ABC signals are transmitted from the same masts.

| | | ACT | NSW | VIC | QLD | SA | TAS | WA | NT | Extra territorial* | Nationwide |
|---|---|---|---|---|---|---|---|---|---|---|---|
| ABC | Metropolitan | 4 | 10 | 15 | 13 | 15 | 2 | 7 | 3 | | 69 |
| ABC | Regional | | 125 | 70 | 155 | 33 | 42 | 74 | 14 | 5 | 518 |
| ABC | Total | 4 | 135 | 85 | 168 | 48 | 44 | 81 | 17 | 5 | 587 |
| SBS | Metropolitan | 4 | 10 | 15 | 13 | 15 | 2 | 7 | 3 | | 69 |
| SBS | Regional | | 120 | 70 | 141 | 27 | 36 | 64 | 7 | 5 | 470 |
| SBS | Total | 4 | 130 | 85 | 154 | 42 | 38 | 71 | 10 | 5 | 539 |

=== Private networks ===
Some commercial broadcasters have a call sign that operates over multiple areas, whereas others may only serve a single area. This is due to historical ownership of regional stations. Nevertheless, most regional stations are now affiliated with the major metropolitan networks.

| Broadcast Call Sign | ACT | NSW | VIC | QLD | SA | TAS | WA | NT | Extra territorial* | Nationwide |
|---|---|---|---|---|---|---|---|---|---|---|
| CTC | 3 | 67 | | | | | | | | 70 |
| AMN | | 3 | | | | | | | | 3 |
| ATN | | 11 | | | | | | | | 11 |
| BDN | | 1 | | | | | | | | 1 |
| BKN | | 1 | | | | | | | | 1 |
| CBN | 3 | 61 | | | | | | | | 64 |
| MDN | | 3 | | | | | | | | 3 |
| MTN | | 3 | | | | | | | | 3 |
| NBN | | 46 | | 4 | | | | | | 50 |
| NEN | | 44 | | 4 | | | | | | 48 |
| NRN | | 41 | | 4 | | | | | | 45 |
| SCN | | 1 | | | | | | | | 1 |
| TCN | | 11 | | | | | | | | 11 |
| TEN | | 11 | | | | | | | | 11 |
| TSN | | 1 | | | | | | | | 1 |
| WIN | 3 | 61 | | | | | | | | 64 |
| AMV | | 8 | 66 | | | | | | | 74 |
| ATV | | | 16 | | | | | | | 16 |
| BCV | | 1 | 29 | | | | | | | 30 |
| GLV | | 7 | 39 | | | | | | | 46 |
| GTV | | | 16 | | | | | | | 16 |
| HSV | | | 16 | | | | | | | 16 |
| MDV | | | 4 | | | | | | | 4 |
| MGV | | | 2 | | | | | | | 2 |
| PTV | | | 4 | | | | | | | 4 |
| STV | | | 4 | | | | | | | 4 |
| VTV | | 8 | 64 | | | | | | | 72 |
| BTQ | | | | 15 | | | | | | 15 |
| CTQ | | | | 1 | | | | | | 1 |
| IDQ | | | | 1 | | | | | | 1 |
| ITQ | | | | 1 | | | | | | 1 |
| QQQ | | 6 | | 37 | 4 | | | 7 | 1 | 55 |
| QTQ | | | | 15 | | | | | | 15 |
| RTQ | | | | 108 | | | | | | 108 |
| STQ | | | | 102 | | | | | | 102 |
| TNQ | | | | 107 | | | | | | 107 |
| TVQ | | | | 16 | | | | | | 16 |
| ADS | | | | | 18 | | | | | 18 |
| CTS | | | | | 1 | | | | | 1 |
| GDS | | | | | 10 | | | | | 10 |
| GTS | | | | | 13 | | | | | 13 |
| LRS | | | | | 6 | | | | | 6 |
| MGS | | | | | 6 | | | | | 6 |
| NWS | | | | | 18 | | | | | 18 |
| RDS | | | | | 6 | | | | | 6 |
| RTS | | | | | 7 | | | | | 7 |
| SAS | | | | | 18 | | | | | 18 |
| SDS | | | | | 6 | | | | | 6 |
| SES | | | | | 6 | | | | | 6 |
| SGS | | | | | 10 | | | | | 10 |
| ACT | | | | | | | | 2 | | 2 |
| CDT | | 6 | | 37 | 4 | | | 7 | 1 | 55 |
| SMT | | 1 | | | | | | | | 1 |
| TDT | | | | | | 35 | | | | 35 |
| TNT | | | | | | 37 | | | | 37 |
| TVT | | | | | | 35 | | | | 35 |
| CTW | | | | | | | 1 | | | 1 |
| GDW | | | | | | | 6 | | | 6 |
| GTW | | | | | | | 6 | | | 6 |
| NEW | | | | | | | 9 | | | 9 |
| SDW | | | | | | | 15 | | | 15 |
| SSW | | | | | | | 15 | | | 15 |
| STW | | | | | | | 8 | | | 8 |
| TVW | | | | | | | 9 | | | 9 |
| VDW | | | | | | | 7 | | | 7 |
| VEW | | | | | | | 7 | | | 7 |
| WAW | | | | | | | 34 | | 4 | 38 |
| WDW | | | | | | | 34 | | 4 | 38 |
| WOW | | | | | | | 62 | | 4 | 66 |
| DTD | | | | | | | | 3 | | 3 |
| NTD | | | | | | | | 3 | | 3 |
| TND | | | | | | | | 3 | | 3 |
| IMP | | 6 | | 38 | 4 | | | 7 | 1 | 56 |
| Total Commercial | 9 | 409 | 260 | 490 | 137 | 107 | 213 | 32 | 15 | 1672 |

== New Zealand frequencies ==
Digital television in New Zealand currently uses UHF frequencies between channels 26 and 39 (510-622 MHz), with channel 25 used as a guard band. Channels 40 to 48 are currently allocated but reserved; frequencies above this have been reallocated to 4G (LTE) mobile phone services in the 700 MHz band.

Rights held directly by the New Zealand Crown are managed by government entity Radio Spectrum Management. Frequency allocations are made to TV operators, both national (such as Television New Zealand and Sky Free) as well as network operators Kordia (the former distribution arm of TVNZ) and JDA.

Channels 38 and 39 are currently provided to Te Mātāwai, a representative body established (by the Māori Language Act 2016) to represent Māori language interests, for use by the Māori Television Service.

Radio Spectrum Management last released a list of spectrum licence holders in June 2019, with more recent data in their Register of Radio Frequencies.

== See also ==
- Television channel frequencies
  - European cable television frequencies
  - Pan-American television frequencies
  - Television channel frequencies
  - Ultra high frequency
  - Very high frequency
- Broadcast television systems
  - ATSC (standards)
  - Multichannel television sound
  - NTSC
  - NTSC-J
  - PAL
  - RCA
  - SECAM
