= Pennine Radio =

Pennine Radio may refer to:

- Pennine Radio Limited, an electronics company in Huddersfield.
- Pennine Radio (radio station), a former radio station based in Bradford (now known as the Pulse).
- Pennine FM, a former radio station based in Huddersfield (previously known as Home FM and Huddersfield FM).
