= Pennine Radio Limited =

Coordinates: 53°39.01′N 1°47.111′W

Pennine Radio Limited is a UK manufacturer of electronic equipment, transformers and inductors, ride on electric golf carts, sheet metalwork and computer equipment.
Founded in 1958 the company started off producing radio receivers and adapters to enable the new band III ITV television broadcasts. However they soon expanded into industrial electronics. In the early days, they produced many innovative designs for the woollen industry which surrounded Huddersfield.

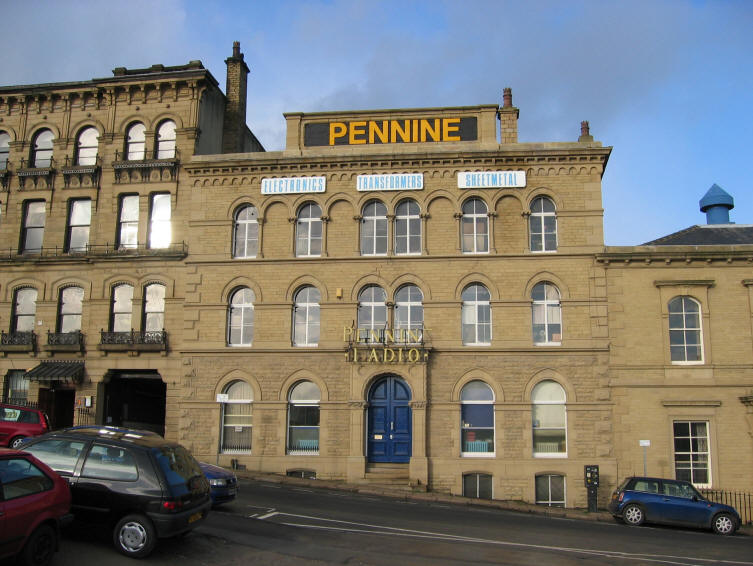
PRL headquarters, in Huddersfield

Pennine Radio's headquarters are in a Victorian Grade II listed building on Fitzwilliam Street, Huddersfield.

The company currently manufactures golf carts, transformers, and offers contract printed circuit board, electronics assembly, and sheet-metal fabrication. The company is wholly owned by one family.
