= European cable television frequencies =

These tables detail the frequencies used in European cable networks. Cable networks use frequencies which are used by different users terrestrially, like the military, police radio, etc. Because of the late introduction of cable television in Europe, older television sets generally could not receive the special cable-only channels, so some countries (like Germany) still have the rule that the public TV stations must be located either in Band I or Band III. The Hyperband was allocated later than the other cable-only channels, so television sets produced in the late-1980s and early-1990s may lack this band.

In most cable networks, the UHF band is unusable because its frequency is too high, so TV stations are only allocated within Band I, III, the Mid-, Super- and Hyperband. Even in modern cable networks, only some UHF channels (like only channels 21–26) may be usable. This leads to a high level of congestion in many European cable TV networks, especially as analogue transmission, which is still commonplace in cable television in Europe, is being migrated to digital transmission.

== Band I ==
Channel	Video Carrier (MHz)	QAM Carrier (MHz)	Audio Carrier (MHz)
2	48.25		53.75
3	55.25		60.75
4	62.25		67.75
X	69.25		74.75
Y	76.25		81.75
Z	83.25		88.75
Z+1	90.25		95.75
Z+2	97.25		102.75
D73		73.00
D81		81.00

- Channels 2–4, if they are used for TV, are only used for analog transmission. In other cases, the frequencies are in use for DOCSIS.
- Channels X, Y, Z, Z+1, Z+2, if they are used for TV, are only used for analog transmission.
- Channels D73 and D81 are not formally assigned, but are used in certain regions of Germany as an interim solution until the cable networks are upgraded. In other regions, programs on these channels are usually located in the UHF band.

== Midband ==
Channel	Video Carrier (MHz)	QAM Carrier (MHz)	Audio Carrier (MHz)
S01	105.25	106.00 to 107.50	110.75
S02	112.25	113.00 to 114.50	117.75
S03	119.25	120.00 to 121.50	124.75
S04	126.25	127.00 to 128.50	131.75
S05	133.25	134.00 to 135.50	138.75
S06	140.25	141.00 to 142.50	145.75
S07	147.25	148.00 to 149.50	152.75
S08	154.25	155.00 to 156.50	159.75
S09	161.25	162.00 to 163.50	166.75
S10	168.25	169.00 to 170.50	173.75

- Channel S01 cannot be used at all because it overlaps with the FM radio band.
- The frequency used by channels S02-S05 are used terrestrially for airband radio. This has led to disruptions in aircraft operations due to cable TV channels. Therefore, some countries, like Germany, have prohibited the use of these frequencies for analogue transmission in recent times.
- Because analogue VHF transmission used a bandwidth of 7 MHz, but digital transmissions need 8 MHz, the frequencies are shifted accordingly, with one channel being unavailable for digital transmission. Due to the proximity to the FM radio band, some cable networks have opted to further shifting the frequencies by one megahertz.
- Because analogue transmission on these frequencies uses 7 MHz bandwidth, digital also uses the same bandwidth. QAM carrier frequencies can vary in 0.5 MHz steps in the given range.

== CCIR Band III ==
Channel	Video Carrier (MHz)	QAM Carrier (MHz)	Audio Carrier (MHz)
5	175.25	177.50	180.75
6	182.25	184.50	187.75
7	189.25	191.50	194.75
8	196.25	198.50	201.75
9	203.25	205.50	208.75
10	210.25	212.50	215.75
11	217.25	219.50	222.75
12	224.25	226.50	229.75

- These channels are only used for analog and digital transmission.
- Because of the CCIR analogue channel raster, digital transmission also uses 7 MHz bandwidth channels. Only the OIRT channel raster uses 8 MHz bandwidth in VHF band III.

== OIRT Band III ==
Channel	Video Carrier (MHz)	QAM Carrier (MHz)	Audio Carrier (MHz)
6	175.25	178.00	181.75
7	183.25	186.00	189.75
8	191.25	194.00	197.75
9	199.25	202.00	205.75
10	207.25	210.00	213.75
11	215.25	218.00	221.75
12	223.25	226.00	229.75

- In VHF band III, 8 MHz channel bandwidth is not used in the EU for digital transmission.

== Superband ==
Channel	Video Carrier (MHz)	QAM Carrier (MHz)	Audio Carrier (MHz)
S11	231.25	234.00	236.75
S12	238.25	241.00	243.75
S13	245.25	248.00	250.75
S14	252.25	255.00	257.75
S15	259.25	262.00	264.75
S16	266.25	269.00	271.75
S17	273.25	276.00	278.75
S18	280.25	283.00	285.75
S19	287.25	290.00	292.75
S20	294.25	297.00	299.75

== Hyperband ==
Channel	Video Carrier (MHz)	QAM Carrier (MHz)	Audio Carrier (MHz)
S21	303.25	306.00	308.75
S22	311.25	314.00	316.75
S23	319.25	322.00	324.75
S24	327.25	330.00	332.75
S25	335.25	338.00	340.75
S26	343.25	346.00	348.75
S27	351.25	354.00	356.75
S28	359.25	362.00	364.75
S29	367.25	370.00	372.75
S30	375.25	378.00	380.75
S31	383.25	386.00	388.75
S32	391.25	394.00	396.75
S33	399.25	402.00	404.75
S34	407.25	410.00	412.75
S35	415.25	418.00	420.75
S36	423.25	426.00	428.75
S37	431.25	434.00	436.75
S38	439.25	442.00	444.75
S39	447.25	450.00	452.75
S40	455.25	458.00	460.75
S41	463.25	466.00	468.75

== Band IV ==
Channel	Video Carrier (MHz)	QAM Carrier (MHz)	Audio Carrier (MHz)
21	471.25	474.00	476.75
22	479.25	482.00	484.75
23	487.25	490.00	492.75
24	495.25	498.00	500.75
25	503.25	506.00	508.75
26	511.25	514.00	516.75
27	519.25	522.00	524.75
28	527.25	530.00	532.75
29	535.25	538.00	540.75
30	543.25	546.00	548.75
31	551.25	554.00	556.75
32	559.25	562.00	564.75
33	567.25	570.00	572.75
34	575.25	578.00	580.75
35	583.25	586.00	588.75
36	591.25	594.00	596.75
37	599.25	602.00	604.75

== Band V ==
Channel	Video Carrier (MHz)	QAM Carrier (MHz)	Audio Carrier (MHz)
38	607.25	610.00	612.75
39	615.25	618.00	620.75
40	623.25	626.00	628.75
41	631.25	634.00	636.75
42	639.25	642.00	644.75
43	647.25	650.00	652.75
44	655.25	658.00	660.75
45	663.25	666.00	668.75
46	671.25	674.00	676.75
47	679.25	682.00	684.75
48	687.25	690.00	692.75
49	695.25	698.00	700.75
50	703.25	706.00	708.75
51	711.25	714.00	716.75
52	719.25	722.00	724.75
53	727.25	730.00	732.75
54	735.25	738.00	740.75
55	743.25	746.00	748.75
56	751.25	754.00	756.75
57	759.25	762.00	764.75
58	767.25	770.00	772.75
59	775.25	778.00	780.75
60	783.25	786.00	788.75
61	791.25	794.00	796.75
62	799.25	802.00	804.75
63	807.25	810.00	812.75
64	815.25	818.00	820.75
65	823.25	826.00	828.75
66	831.25	834.00	836.75
67	839.25	842.00	844.75
68	847.25	850.00	852.75
69	855.25	858.00	860.75

== See also ==
- Australian and New Zealand television frequencies
- Broadcast television systems
- Pan-American television frequencies
- Television channel frequencies
