= Pan-American television frequencies =

Frequencies on the radio spectrum used by television broadcasters in the Americas

The Pan-American television frequencies are different for terrestrial and cable television systems. Terrestrial television channels are divided into two bands: the VHF band which comprises channels 2 through 13 and occupies frequencies between 54 and 216 MHz, and the UHF band, which comprises channels 14 through 36 and occupies frequencies between 470 and 608 MHz. These bands are different enough in frequency that they often require separate antennas to receive (although many antennas cover both VHF and UHF), and separate tuning controls on the television set. The VHF band is further divided into two frequency ranges: VHF low band (Band I) between 54 and 88 MHz, containing channels 2 through 6, and VHF high band (Band III) between 174 and 216 MHz, containing channels 7 through 13. The wide spacing between these frequency bands is responsible for the complicated design of rooftop TV antennas. The UHF band has higher noise and greater attenuation, so higher gain antennas are often required for UHF.

== Terrestrial television ==
=== History ===
The VHF band plan was modified several times before 1948. The last of these changes was the deletion of channel 1, originally intended as a community channel. This allocation of the spectrum was given to two-way land-mobile radio.

UHF channels 70–83 in the United States were reallocated in 1983.

In March 2008, the FCC requested public comment on turning the bandwidth currently occupied by analog television channels 5 and 6 (76–88 MHz) over to extending the FM terrestrial band when the DTT transition was to be completed in February 2009 (ultimately delayed to June 2009). This proposed allocation would effectively assign frequencies corresponding to the existing Japanese FM radio service (which begins at 76 MHz) for use as an extension to the existing North American FM broadcast band.

=== 700 MHz band ===
The UHF 700 MHz band comprised the spectrum of UHF channels 52 through 69. Channels 52–69 are no longer available for normal, high-power digital terrestrial television broadcasting in the United States, but some channels are available for use as low-power or translator stations. Wireless microphones and medical telemetry devices shared some of the space on this television band, if transmitting at a very low power. After the migration to digital terrestrial television in 2009, the Federal Communications Commission (FCC) banned all of these from using the 700 MHz band, effective June 12, 2010. The 700 MHz band is now used for public safety communications and wireless broadband providers.

=== 600 MHz band ===
In 2017 the FCC auctioned off all remaining UHF spectrum including and above UHF channel 38. This required the reconfiguration of channel allotment (known in the terrestrial television industry as the channel "repack"), allowing for higher gain small antennas to cover a smaller frequency range. In April 2017 it was decided that channels 38 to 51 would be deleted, but channel 37 remains reserved. Channel repacking proceeded in 10 phases from September 2018 through July 2020.

=== Channel frequencies ===
==== VHF band ====
VHF low-band (band I) (frequencies in MHz)
Channel	Lower edge	Video carrier	ATSC pilot	Audio carrier	Upper edge
1	44	45.25	44.31	49.75	50
(Gap in band plan used by amateur radio 6-meter band)
2	54	55.25	54.31	59.75	60
3	60	61.25	60.31	65.75	66
4	66	67.25	66.31	71.75	72
(Gap in band plan used by aeronautical navigation)
5	76	77.25	76.31	81.75	82
6	82	83.25	82.31	87.75	88

VHF high-band (band III) (frequencies in MHz)
Channel	Lower edge	Video carrier	ATSC pilot	Audio carrier	Upper edge
7	174	175.25	174.31	179.75	180
8	180	181.25	180.31	185.75	186
9	186	187.25	186.31	191.75	192
10	192	193.25	192.31	197.75	198
11	198	199.25	198.31	203.75	204
12	204	205.25	204.31	209.75	210
13	210	211.25	210.31	215.75	216

==== UHF band ====
The following table lists terrestrial television channels in the ultra high frequency band as they were allocated in their modern form by the Federal Communications Commission on April 11, 1952. The original allocation included 70 UHF channels (14–83) with 6 MHz separation. In the decades since, many of the channels have been de-allocated and reserved for other purposes. Channels 14–36 are usable UHF channels in the United States after the most recent change was completed in 2020. Formerly allocated channels are indicated with a colored background, and their dispositions are explained in the notes below the table.

UHF band (frequencies in MHz)
Channel	Lower edge	Video carrier	ATSC pilot	Audio carrier	Upper edge
14	470	471.25	470.31	475.75	476
15	476	477.25	476.31	481.75	482
16	482	483.25	482.31	487.75	488
17	488	489.25	488.31	493.75	494
18	494	495.25	494.31	499.75	500
19	500	501.25	500.31	505.75	506
20	506	507.25	506.31	511.75	512
21	512	513.25	512.31	517.75	518
22	518	519.25	518.31	523.75	524
23	524	525.25	524.31	529.75	530
24	530	531.25	530.31	535.75	536
25	536	537.25	536.31	541.75	542
26	542	543.25	542.31	547.75	548
27	548	549.25	548.31	553.75	554
28	554	555.25	554.31	559.75	560
29	560	561.25	560.31	565.75	566
30	566	567.25	566.31	571.75	572
31	572	573.25	572.31	577.75	578
32	578	579.25	578.31	583.75	584
33	584	585.25	584.31	589.75	590
34	590	591.25	590.31	595.75	596
35	596	597.25	596.31	601.75	602
36	602	603.25	602.31	607.75	608
37	608	609.25	608.31	613.75	614
38	614	615.25	614.31	619.75	620
39	620	621.25	620.31	625.75	626
40	626	627.25	626.31	631.75	632
41	632	633.25	632.31	637.75	638
42	638	639.25	638.31	643.75	644
43	644	645.25	644.31	649.75	650
44	650	651.25	650.31	655.75	656
45	656	657.25	656.31	661.75	662
46	662	663.25	662.31	667.75	668
47	668	669.25	668.31	673.75	674
48	674	675.25	674.31	679.75	680
49	680	681.25	680.31	685.75	686
50	686	687.25	686.31	691.75	692
51	692	693.25	692.31	697.75	698
52	698	699.25	698.31	703.75	704
53	704	705.25	704.31	709.75	710
54	710	711.25	710.31	715.75	716
55	716	717.25	716.31	721.75	722
56	722	723.25	722.31	727.75	728
57	728	729.25	728.31	733.75	734
58	734	735.25	734.31	739.75	740
59	740	741.25	740.31	745.75	746
60	746	747.25	746.31	751.75	752
61	752	753.25	752.31	757.75	758
62	758	759.25	758.31	763.75	764
63	764	765.25	764.31	769.75	770
64	770	771.25	770.31	775.75	776
65	776	777.25	776.31	781.75	782
66	782	783.25	782.31	787.75	788
67	788	789.25	788.31	793.75	794
68	794	795.25	794.31	799.75	800
69	800	801.25	800.31	805.75	806
70	806	807.25	806.31	811.75	812
71	812	813.25	812.31	817.75	818
72	818	819.25	818.31	823.75	824
73	824	825.25	824.31	829.75	830
74	830	831.25	830.31	835.75	836
75	836	837.25	836.31	841.75	842
76	842	843.25	842.31	847.75	848
77	848	849.25	848.31	853.75	854
78	854	855.25	854.31	859.75	860
79	860	861.25	860.31	865.75	866
80	866	867.25	866.31	871.75	872
81	872	873.25	872.31	877.75	878
82	878	879.25	878.31	883.75	884
83	884	885.25	884.31	889.75	890

==== Notes ====
- Channel 1 (shaded violet above) was removed for the land mobile service. One San Francisco station, KAXT-CD, was assigned Channel 1 as a virtual channel in 2017, but broadcasts on UHF channel 22. Similarly, in Mexico, since October 25, 2016, all Azteca Uno stations are assigned virtual channel 1.1.
- Channel 37 (shaded pink above) is reserved for radio astronomy in the United States, Canada, Bermuda and the Bahamas; thus there are no television stations assigned to it. Mexico, Colombia, Chile, Peru, Brazil and Argentina informally observe a ban on transmitters using the channel. One New York City station, WNWT-LD, was assigned Channel 37 as a virtual channel in 2019, but broadcasts on VHF channel 3.
- Channels 38 through 51 (the 600 MHz band, shaded yellow above) have been displaced in the US by the Broadcast incentive auction.
- On August 22, 2011, the United States' Federal Communications Commission announced a freeze on all future applications for broadcast stations requesting to use channel 51, to prevent adjacent-channel interference to the A-Block of the 700 MHz band. Later that year (on December 16, 2011), Industry Canada and the CRTC followed suit in placing a moratorium on future television stations using channel 51 for broadcast use for the same reason.
- Channels 52 through 69 (the 700 MHz band, shaded brown above) in the United States have been reallocated following the conversion to digital TV on June 12, 2009, although some low-power and translator stations may still be in use on these channels.
- The frequencies used by UHF channels 70 through 83 (shaded blue above) were reallocated to the Land Mobile Radio System (Public Safety and Trunked Radio) and mobile phones in a CCIR worldwide convention in 1983.
- With the advent of digital television in 2009, stations are allowed to identify themselves by a virtual channel that may not necessarily be the same as the station's RF channel. Virtual channels 1, 37, and 70 to 99 can be assigned via PSIP even though there is no corresponding physical station on that RF channel.

===== Cable television frequency issues =====
- UHF channels 14 to 43 translate to common cable-ready channels 65 to 94 (add 51).
- UHF channels 44 to 83 translate to rarely used cable TV channels 100 to 139 (add 56).
- Cable-ready channels 6, 95, 96, and 97 have audio carriers which overlap FM radio stations (87.7, 95.7, 101.7 and 107.7).
- Cable-ready channels 57 to 61 overlap the 70cm amateur radio band and can be used for amateur television.
- Cable-ready channel 64 is within the Family Radio Service and General Mobile Radio Service (GMRS) band.

=== Historical band plans ===
VHF low-band (bands I & II) 1940 U.S. channel assignments (partly deprecated) (frequencies in MHz)
Channel	Lower edge	Video carrier	Audio carrier	Upper edge	Current U.S. use
1 / FM^{a}	44	45.25	49.75	50	Experimental (TV ch. 1)
2 / 1^{a}	50	51.25	55.75	56	Amateur band, TV ch. 2
(Break in band plan)
* / 2^{a}	60	61.25	65.75	66	TV ch. 3
3	66	67.25	71.75	72	TV ch. 4
(Break in band plan)
4	78	79.25	83.75	84	TV ch. 5, TV ch. 6,
5	84	85.25	89.75	90	TV ch. 6, non-commercial educational FM radio
(Break in band plan)
6	96	97.25	101.75	102	FM broadcasting
7	102	103.25	107.75	108	FM broadcasting

^a The band 44–56 MHz was modified in May of 1940; before, it was assigned to TV channels 1 and 2; after the modification, it was assigned to FM broadcasting and TV channel 1.

VHF high-band (band III) 1940 U.S. channel assignments (partly deprecated) (frequencies in MHz)
Channel	Lower edge	Video carrier	Audio carrier	Upper edge	Current U.S. use
8	162	163.25	167.75	168	NOAA Weather Radio (162)
(Break in band plan)
9	180	181.25	185.75	186	TV ch. 8
10	186	187.25	191.75	192	TV ch. 9
(Break in band plan)
11	204	205.25	209.75	210	TV ch. 12
12	210	211.25	215.75	216	TV ch. 13
(Break in band plan)
13	234	235.25	239.75	240	Military
14	240	241.25	245.75	246	Military
(Break in band plan)
15	258	259.25	263.75	264	Military
16	264	265.25	269.75	270	Military
(Break in band plan)
17	282	283.25	287.75	288	Military
18	288	289.25	293.75	294	Military

== Cable television ==
=== Harmonically-related carriers (HRC) ===
Harmonically-related carriers (HRC) is a system for assigning television channel numbers to bands of frequencies over a cable television network. William Grant, in his book, states:

"By harmonically relating the carrier frequencies themselves it is … possible to improve system performance. This does not reduce the beats produced, but positions them within the system transmission spectrum, such that they are more tolerable. In effect, all signal carriers are spaced precisely at 6 MHz apart, and thus, all beats generated are at 6 MHz increments. Since the television signals are vestigial sideband modulation, if the beat products can be manipulated to fall on or near the Radio frequency carriers themselves, they are much less offensive."

=== Incrementally-related carriers (IRC) ===
Incrementally-related carriers (IRC) is a system for assigning television channel numbers to bands of frequencies over a cable television network. The IRC plan attempts to minimize distortion products by deriving all video carrier signals from a common source. The IRC system assigns channel frequencies (for the Pan-American NTSC-M system) spaced 6 MHz apart. In an IRC system, the VHF channels are at their off-air frequencies except for channels 5 and 6, which will be 2 MHz higher than usual.

Both HRC and IRC systems have the added advantage of allowing for one extra channel to be positioned between channels four and five, as the gap between them increases from 4 MHz wide to 6 MHz wide. It is often mapped as channel one or channels 2, 3, and 4 become channels 1, 2, and 3, and the new one becomes channel 5.

=== Channel frequencies ===
These frequencies are used for both NTSC-based analog television and QAM-based digital television. Band plans for Pan-American American cable television systems are standardized in EIA standard 542-B.

Channels 57 to 61, and 143 to 145, are used in amateur television.

NOTE: Frequencies given are for luminance carriers. For channel center frequencies, add 1.75 MHz.

Channel number	Channel letter	Standard video carrier (MHz)	Harmonically-related video carrier (MHz)	Incrementally-related video carrier (MHz)	QAM / CDSREF carrier (MHz)	Audio carrier (MHz)
Subband "T" channels						
	T-7	7.25	6.0003	7.25	9.00	11.75
	T-8	13.25	12.0006	13.25	15.00	17.75
	T-9	19.25	18.0009	19.25	21.00	23.75
	T-10	25.25	24.0012	25.25	27.00	29.75
	T-11	31.25	30.0015	31.25	33.00	35.75
	T-12	37.25	36.0018	37.25	39.00	41.75
	T-13	43.25	42.0021	43.25	45.00	47.75
	T-14	49.25	48.0024	49.25	51.00	53.75
(Break in band plan)
Lowband						
2	2	55.25	54.0027	55.25	57.00	59.75
3	3	61.25	60.0030	61.25	63.00	65.75
4	4	67.25	66.0033	67.25	69.00	71.75
1	A-8 (4A or 5A)	72.25	72.0036	73.25	75.00	77.75
5	5 (or A-7)	77.25	78.0039	79.25	79.00 or 81.00	81.75 or 83.75
6	6 (or A-6)	83.25	84.0042	85.25	85.00 or 87.00	87.75 or 89.75
Midband						
95	X or A-5	91.25	90.0045	91.25	93.00	95.75
96	Y or A-4	97.25	96.0048	97.25	99.00	101.75
97	Z or A-3	103.25	102.0051	103.25	105.00	107.75
98	00 or A-2	109.25	108.0054	109.25	111.00	113.75
99	01 or A-1	115.25	114.0057	115.25	117.00	119.75
Midband						
14	A	121.25	120.0060	121.25	123.00	125.75
15	B	127.25	126.0063	127.25	129.00	131.75
16	C	133.25	132.0066	133.25	135.00	137.75
17	D	139.25	138.0069	139.25	141.00	143.75
18	E	145.25	144.0072	145.25	147.00	149.75
19	F	151.25	150.0075	151.25	153.00	155.75
20	G	157.25	156.0078	157.25	159.00	161.75
21	H	163.25	162.0081	163.25	165.00	167.75
22	I	169.25	168.0084	169.25	171.00	173.75
Highband						
7	7	175.25	174.0087	175.25	177.00	179.75
8	8	181.25	180.0090	181.25	183.00	185.75
9	9	187.25	186.0093	187.25	189.00	191.75
10	10	193.25	192.0096	193.25	195.00	197.75
11	11	199.25	198.0099	199.25	201.00	203.75
12	12	205.25	204.0102	205.25	207.00	209.75
13	13	211.25	210.0105	211.25	213.00	215.75
Superband						
23	J	217.25	216.0108	217.25	219.00	221.75
24	K	223.25	222.0111	223.25	225.00	227.75
25	L	229.25	228.0114	229.25	231.00	233.75
26	M	235.25	234.0117	235.25	237.00	239.75
27	N	241.25	240.0120	241.25	243.00	245.75
28	O	247.25	246.0123	247.25	249.00	251.75
29	P	253.25	252.0126	253.25	255.00	257.75
30	Q	259.25	258.0129	259.25	261.00	263.75
31	R	265.25	264.0132	265.25	267.00	269.75
32	S	271.25	270.0135	271.25	273.00	275.75
33	T	277.25	276.0138	277.25	279.00	281.75
34	U	283.25	282.0141	283.25	285.00	287.75
35	V	289.25	288.0144	289.25	291.00	293.75
36	W	295.25	294.0147	295.25	297.00	299.75
Hyperband						
37	AA or W+1	301.25	300.0150	301.25	303.00	305.75
38	BB or W+2	307.25	306.0153	307.25	309.00	311.75
39	CC or W+3	313.25	312.0156	313.25	315.00	317.75
40	DD or W+4	319.25	318.0159	319.25	321.00	323.75
41	EE or W+5	325.25	324.0162	325.25	327.00	329.75
42	FF or W+6	331.25	330.0165	331.25	333.00	335.75
43	GG or W+7	337.25	336.0168	337.25	339.00	341.75
44	HH or W+8	343.25	342.0171	343.25	345.00	347.75
45	II or W+9	349.25	348.0174	349.25	351.00	353.75
46	JJ or W+10	355.25	354.0177	355.25	357.00	359.75
47	KK or W+11	361.25	360.0180	361.25	363.00	365.75
48	LL or W+12	367.25	366.0183	367.25	369.00	371.75
49	MM or W+13	373.25	372.0186	373.25	375.00	377.75
50	NN or W+14	379.25	378.0189	379.25	381.00	383.75
51	OO or W+15	385.25	384.0192	385.25	387.00	389.75
52	PP or W+16	391.25	390.0195	391.25	393.00	395.75
53	QQ or W+17	397.25	396.0198	397.25	399.00	401.75
54	RR or W+18	403.25	402.0201	403.25	405.00	407.75
55	SS or W+19	409.25	408.0204	409.25	411.00	413.75
56	TT or W+20	415.25	414.0207	415.25	417.00	419.75
57	UU or W+21	421.25	420.0210	421.25	423.00	425.75
58	VV or W+22	427.25	426.0213	427.25	429.00	431.75
59	WW or W+23	433.25	432.0216	433.25	435.00	437.75
60	XX or W+24	439.25	438.0219	439.25	441.00	443.75
61	YY or W+25	445.25	444.0222	445.25	447.00	449.75
62	ZZ or W+26	451.25	450.0225	451.25	453.00	455.75
63	AAA or W+27	457.25	456.0228	457.25	459.00	461.75
64	BBB or W+28	463.25	462.0231	463.25	465.00	467.75
Ultraband						
65	CCC or W+29	469.25	468.0234	469.25	471.00	473.75
66	DDD or W+30	475.25	474.0237	475.25	477.00	479.75
67	EEE or W+31	481.25	480.0240	481.25	483.00	485.75
68	FFF or W+32	487.25	486.0243	487.25	489.00	491.75
69	GGG or W+33	493.25	492.0246	493.25	495.00	497.75
70	HHH or W+34	499.25	498.0249	499.25	501.00	503.75
71	III or W+35	505.25	504.0252	505.25	507.00	509.75
72	JJJ or W+36	511.25	510.0255	511.25	513.00	515.75
73	KKK or W+37	517.25	516.0258	517.25	519.00	521.75
74	LLL or W+38	523.25	522.0261	523.25	525.00	527.75
75	MMM or W+39	529.25	528.0264	529.25	531.00	533.75
76	NNN or W+40	535.25	534.0267	535.25	537.00	539.75
77	OOO or W+41	541.25	540.0270	541.25	543.00	545.75
78	PPP or W+42	547.25	546.0273	547.25	549.00	551.75
79	QQQ or W+43	553.25	552.0276	553.25	555.00	557.75
80	RRR or W+44	559.25	558.0279	559.25	561.00	563.75
81	SSS or W+45	565.25	564.0282	565.25	567.00	569.75
82	TTT or W+46	571.25	570.0285	571.25	573.00	575.75
83	UUU or W+47	577.25	576.0288	577.25	579.00	581.75
84	VVV or W+48	583.25	582.0291	583.25	585.00	587.75
85	WWW or W+49	589.25	588.0294	589.25	591.00	593.75
86	XXX or W+50	595.25	594.0297	595.25	597.00	599.75
87	YYY or W+51	601.25	600.0300	601.25	603.00	605.75
88	ZZZ or W+52	607.25	606.0303	607.25	609.00	611.75
89	89 or W+53	613.25	612.0306	613.25	615.00	617.75
90	90 or W+54	619.25	618.0309	619.25	621.00	623.75
91	91 or W+55	625.25	624.0312	625.25	627.00	629.75
92	92 or W+56	631.25	630.0315	631.25	633.00	635.75
93	93 or W+57	637.25	636.0318	637.25	639.00	641.75
94	94 or W+58	643.25	642.0321	643.25	645.00	647.75
Jumboband						
100	100 or W+59	649.25	648.0324	649.25	651.00	653.75
101	101 or W+60	655.25	654.0327	655.25	657.00	659.75
102	102 or W+61	661.25	660.0330	661.25	663.00	665.75
103	103 or W+62	667.25	666.0333	667.25	669.00	671.75
104	104 or W+63	673.25	672.0336	673.25	675.00	677.75
105	105 or W+64	679.25	678.0339	679.25	681.00	683.75
106	106 or W+65	685.25	684.0342	685.25	687.00	689.75
107	107 or W+66	691.25	690.0345	691.25	693.00	695.75
108	108 or W+67	697.25	696.0348	697.25	699.00	701.75
109	109 or W+68	703.25	702.0351	703.25	705.00	707.75
110	110 or W+69	709.25	708.0354	709.25	711.00	713.75
111	111 or W+70	715.25	714.0357	715.25	717.00	719.75
112	112 or W+71	721.25	720.0360	721.25	723.00	725.75
113	113 or W+72	727.25	726.0363	727.25	729.00	731.75
114	114 or W+73	733.25	732.0366	733.25	735.00	737.75
115	115 or W+74	739.25	738.0369	739.25	741.00	743.75
116	116 or W+75	745.25	744.0372	745.25	747.00	749.75
117	117 or W+76	751.25	750.0375	751.25	753.00	755.75
118	118 or W+77	757.25	756.0378	757.25	759.00	761.75
119	119 or W+78	763.25	762.0381	763.25	765.00	767.75
120	120 or W+79	769.25	768.0384	769.25	771.00	773.75
121	121 or W+80	775.25	774.0387	775.25	777.00	779.75
122	122 or W+81	781.25	780.0390	781.25	783.00	785.75
123	123 or W+82	787.25	786.0393	787.25	789.00	791.75
124	124 or W+83	793.25	792.0396	793.25	795.00	797.75
125	125 or W+84	799.25	798.0399	799.25	801.00	803.75
126	126 or W+85	805.25	804.0402	805.25	807.00	809.75
127	127 or W+86	811.25	810.0405	811.25	813.00	815.75
128	128 or W+87	817.25	816.0408	817.25	819.00	821.75
129	129 or W+88	823.25	822.0411	823.25	825.00	827.75
130	130 or W+89	829.25	828.0414	829.25	831.00	833.75
131	131 or W+90	835.25	834.0417	835.25	837.00	839.75
132	132 or W+91	841.25	840.0420	841.25	843.00	845.75
133	133 or W+92	847.25	846.0423	847.25	849.00	851.75
134	134 or W+93	853.25	852.0426	853.25	855.00	857.75
135	135 or W+94	859.25	858.0429	859.25	861.00	863.75
136	136 or W+95	865.25	864.0432	865.25	867.00	869.75
137	137 or W+96	871.25	870.0435	871.25	873.00	875.75
138	138 or W+97	877.25	876.0438	877.25	879.00	881.75
139	139 or W+98	883.25	882.0441	883.25	885.00	887.75
140	140 or W+99	889.25	888.0444	889.25	891.00	893.75
141	141 or W+100	895.25	894.0447	895.25	897.00	899.75
142	142 or W+101	901.25	900.0450	901.25	903.00	905.75
143	143 or W+102	907.25	906.0453	907.25	909.00	911.75
144	144 or W+103	913.25	912.0456	913.25	915.00	917.75
145	145 or W+104	919.25	918.0459	919.25	921.00	923.75
146	146 or W+105	925.25	924.0462	925.25	927.00	929.75
147	147 or W+106	931.25	930.0465	931.25	933.00	935.75
148	148 or W+107	937.25	936.0468	937.25	939.00	941.75
149	149 or W+108	943.25	942.0471	943.25	945.00	947.75
150	150 or W+109	949.25	948.0474	949.25	951.00	953.75
151	151 or W+110	955.25	954.0477	955.25	957.00	959.75
152	152 or W+111	961.25	960.0480	961.25	963.00	965.75
153	153 or W+112	967.25	966.0483	967.25	969.00	971.75
154	154 or W+113	973.25	972.0486	973.25	975.00	977.75
155	155 or W+114	979.25	978.0489	979.25	981.00	983.75
156	156 or W+115	985.25	984.0492	985.25	987.00	989.75
157	157 or W+116	991.25	990.0495	991.25	993.00	995.75
158	158 or W+117	997.25	996.0498	997.25	999.00	1001.75

=== Channel usage ===
Cable channels 98 and 99 (A2 and A1, 108–120 MHz), if used, have appeared as channel 00 and 01 respectively on some cable boxes.

== See also ==
- Australian and New Zealand television frequencies
- Broadcast television systems, including:
  - ATSC
  - DVB
  - NTSC
  - NTSC-J
  - PAL
  - RCA
  - SECAM
- Early television stations
- European cable television frequencies
- Knife-edge effect
- Multichannel television sound
- Television channel frequencies
- Ultra high frequency
- Very high frequency
