= Band IV =

Radio frequency range in the UHF band

Band IV is the name of a radio frequency range within the ultra high frequency part of the electromagnetic spectrum.

Sources differ on the exact frequency range of the band. For example, the Swiss Federal Office of Communications, the Broadcast engineer's reference book and Ericsson India Ltd all define the range of Band IV from 470 to 582 MHz. An EICTA paper defines the range as 474 to 602 MHz, whilst the BBC define the range as 470 to 614 MHz. Band IV is primarily used for analogue and digital (DVB-T, ATSC and ISDB) television broadcasting, as well as services intended for mobile devices such as DVB-H.

== Television ==
=== Australia ===
In Australia UHF channel allocations are 7 MHz wide. Band IV includes channels 28 to 35, with base frequencies of 529.5 MHz to 578.5 MHz. More details are available on the television frequencies page.

=== New Zealand ===
In New Zealand UHF channel allocations are 8 MHz wide. Band IV includes channels 25 to 35, with base frequencies of 506.0 MHz to 586.0 MHz. More details are available on the television frequencies page.

=== United Kingdom ===
In the UK, Band IV allocations are 8 MHz wide, traditionally consisting of 14 channels from UHF 21 to 34 inclusive. However, in the mid-1990s the squeezing of analogue Channel 5 broadcasts into the existing national terrestrial TV transmitter network effectively closed a gap between bands IV and V, which was previously reserved for radar applications and home consumer devices. This stretched the practical definition of Band IV in the UK to cover 18 channels from UHF 21 to 38 inclusive. Aerials of the group A type cover this band.

The following table covers the most inclusive definition of Band IV in the UK. Rows with a yellow background indicate channels which were not traditionally (before the mid-1990s) considered part of Band IV for TV broadcasting purposes and may not be considered part of the band in other countries (e.g. Switzerland).

Channel	Frequency Range
21	470–478 MHz
22	478–486 MHz
23	486–494 MHz
24	494–502 MHz
25	502–510 MHz
26	510–518 MHz
27	518–526 MHz
28	526–534 MHz
29	534–542 MHz
30	542–550 MHz
31	550–558 MHz
32	558–566 MHz
33	566–574 MHz
34	574–582 MHz
35	582–590 MHz
36	590–598 MHz
37	598–606 MHz
38	606–614 MHz
