= Band II =

Range of radio frequencies from 87.5 to 108.0 MHz

Band II is the range of radio frequencies within the very high frequency (VHF) part of the electromagnetic spectrum from 87.5 to 108.0 megahertz (MHz).

== Radio ==
Band II is primarily used worldwide for FM radio broadcasting.

== Broadcast television ==
=== Usage in Russia and in other former members of OIRT ===
In the former Soviet Union and other countries-members of OIRT, frequencies from 76 MHz to 100 MHz were designated for broadcast television usage. Considering 8 MHz channel bandwidth used by the Russian analog television system (System D), the following television channels had been defined:

| Channel | Frequency Range |
|---|---|
| R3 | 76–84 MHz |
| R4 | 84–92 MHz |
| R5 | 92–100 MHz |

Broadcast television channels 1 and 2 are assigned to VHF I band, channels 6 to 12 are assigned to VHF III band.

Starting from the early 1990s, frequencies previously allotted to television channels 4 and 5 have been re-allocated for FM radio, thereby harmonizing it with the Western allocation for FM radio service.

=== Other countries ===
Both Japan, System J and Australia, System B have also had analog TV channels situated within Band II.
