= Band V =

Radio frequency range

Band V (meaning Band 5) is the name of a radio frequency range within the ultra high frequency part of the electromagnetic spectrum. It is not to be confused with the V band in the ultra high frequency part of the spectrum.

Sources differ on the exact frequency range of UHF Band V. For example, the Broadcast engineer's reference book and the BBC define the range as 614 to 854 MHz. The IPTV India Forum define the range as 582 to 806 MHz and the DVB Worldwide website refers to the range as 585 to 806 MHz. Band V is primarily used for analogue and digital (DVB-T & ATSC) television broadcasting, as well as radio microphones and services intended for mobile devices such as DVB-H. With the close-down of analog television services most countries have auctioned off frequencies from 694 MHz and up to 4G cellular network providers.

== Television ==
=== Australia ===
In Australia UHF channel allocations are 7 MHz wide. Band V includes channels 36 to 69, with base frequencies of 585.5 MHz to 816.5 MHz. More details are available on the television frequencies page.

=== New Zealand ===
In New Zealand UHF channel allocations are 8 MHz wide. Band V includes digital channels 36 to 49, with base frequencies of 594.0 MHz to 698.0 MHz. More details are available on the television frequencies page.

=== United Kingdom ===
In the UK, Band V allocations for television are 8 MHz wide, traditionally consisting of 30 channels from UHF 39 to 68 inclusive. There is also a channel 69. Semi-wideband aerials of the group E type cover this entire band. However, aerials of types group B and group C/D will cover the lower and upper halves of Band V respectively with higher gain than a group E.

The following table shows TV channel allocations in Band V in the UK.

- Rows with a yellow background (channels 61–68 inclusive) indicate channels cleared for 4G mobile broadband services following an auction run by the UK spectrum regulator Ofcom in January 2013 and the subsequent award of spectrum (which also included channel 69) to the winning mobile operators on 1 March 2013.
- Rows with an orange background (channels 49–60 inclusive) indicate channels that are due to be cleared so that from 2022 they can be used by mobile data services. The decision to reallocate these channels was published by Ofcom on 19 November 2014.

Channel	Frequency Range
39	614–622 MHz
40	622–630 MHz
41	630–638 MHz
42	638–646 MHz
43	646–654 MHz
44	654–662 MHz
45	662–670 MHz
46	670–678 MHz
47	678–686 MHz
48	686–694 MHz
49	694–702 MHz
50	702–710 MHz
51	710–718 MHz
52	718–726 MHz
53	726–734 MHz
54	734–742 MHz
55	742–750 MHz
56	750–758 MHz
57	758–766 MHz
58	766–774 MHz
59	774–782 MHz
60	782–790 MHz
61	790–798 MHz
62	798–806 MHz
63	806–814 MHz
64	814–822 MHz
65	822–830 MHz
66	830–838 MHz
67	838–846 MHz
68	846–854 MHz

=== United States ===
- 698–806 MHz: Was auctioned in March 2008; bidders got full use after the transition to digital TV was completed on 12 June 2009 (formerly UHF TV channels 52–69). T-Mobile USA, licensee of "block A" (channels 52 and 57), began using its frequency allotment in 2015, in media markets where TV stations on 51 either did not exist or relocated early.
- 614–698 MHz (TV channels 38–51) will be auctioned in March 2016.
