= Band III =

Range of radio frequencies

Band III is the name of the range of radio frequencies within the very high frequency (VHF) part of the electromagnetic spectrum from 174 to 240 megahertz (MHz). It is primarily used for radio and television broadcasting. It is also called high-band VHF, in contrast to Bands I and II.

== Broadcast television ==
=== North America ===
The band is subdivided into seven channels for television broadcasting, each occupying 6 MHz.

Channel	Frequency range
7	174–180 MHz
8	180–186 MHz
9	186–192 MHz
10	192–198 MHz
11	198–204 MHz
12	204–210 MHz
13	210–216 MHz

=== Europe ===
European Band III allocations vary from country to country, with channel widths of 7 or 8 MHz.

The standard channel allocations for European countries that use System B with 7 MHz channel spacing are as follows:

Channel	Frequency range
E5	174–181 MHz
E6	181–188 MHz
E7	188–195 MHz
E8	195–202 MHz
E9	202–209 MHz
E10	209–216 MHz
E11	216–223 MHz
E12	223–230 MHz

The Irish (8 MHz) system is shown below.

Channel	Frequency range
D	174–182 MHz
E	182–190 MHz
F	190–198 MHz
G	198–206 MHz
H	206–214 MHz
i	214-222 MHz
J	222-230 MHz

=== Oceania ===
Australia has allocated 8 channels in Band III for digital television, each with 7 MHz bandwidth.

Channel	Frequency range
6	174–181 MHz
7	181–188 MHz
8	188–195 MHz
9	195–202 MHz
9A	202–209 MHz
10	209–216 MHz
11	216–223 MHz
12	223–230 MHz

=== Russia and other former members of OIRT ===
Russian analog television is transmitted using System D with 8 MHz channel bandwidth.

Channel	Frequency range
6	174–182 MHz
7	182–190 MHz
8	190–198 MHz
9	198–206 MHz
10	206–214 MHz
11	214-222 MHz
12	222-230 MHz

== Radio ==
The band came into use for radio broadcasting at the turn of the 21st century and is used for DAB (Digital Audio Broadcasting).

It is subdivided into a number of frequency blocks used for multiplexes:

Block	Centre Frequency
5A	174.928 MHz
5B	176.640 MHz
5C	178.352 MHz
5D	180.064 MHz
6A	181.936 MHz
6B	183.648 MHz
6C	185.360 MHz
6D	187.072 MHz
7A	188.928 MHz
7B	190.640 MHz
7C	192.352 MHz
7D	194.064 MHz
8A	195.936 MHz
8B	197.648 MHz
8C	199.360 MHz
8D	201.072 MHz
9A	202.928 MHz
9B	204.640 MHz
9C	206.352 MHz
9D	208.064 MHz
10A	209.936 MHz
10B	211.648 MHz
10C	213.360 MHz
10D	215.072 MHz
10N	210.096 MHz
11A	216.928 MHz
11B	218.640 MHz
11C	220.352 MHz
11D	222.064 MHz
11N	217.088 MHz
12A	223.936 MHz
12B	225.648 MHz
12C	227.360 MHz
12D	229.072 MHz
12N	224.096 MHz
13A	230.784 MHz
13B	232.496 MHz
13C	234.208 MHz
13D	235.776 MHz
13E	237.488 MHz
13F	239.200 MHz

Grayed frequencies aren't used for DAB. Furthermore, some countries like Germany don't use channel 13's frequencies to prevent interference with aviation frequencies.

== Worldwide usage ==
=== Europe ===
In the UK and part of Ireland, Band III was originally used for monochrome 405-line television; however, this was discontinued by the mid-1980s. Other European countries (including Ireland) continued to use Band III for analogue 625-line colour television.

Digital television in the DVB-T standard can be used in conjunction with VHF Band III and is used as such in some places. The use of sub-band 2 and sub-band 3 band for Digital audio broadcasting is now being widely adopted. Sub-band 1 is used for MPT-1327 trunked PMR radio, remote wireless microphones and PMSE links.

=== North America ===
In North America, use of the band for television broadcasts is still widespread. Favorable propagation characteristics and reasonable power limits (up to 65 kW for full-power digital television, versus 20 kW or less on VHF Band I) has meant that many US broadcasters elected to move their full-power ATSC stations from UHF frequencies to Band III VHF when all full-power NTSC analog television services in the US shut down in 2009.

Amateur (Ham) Radio has a small allocation of the band, known as the 1.25meter band, from 219 to 220MHz and 222.0 to 225.0 MHz for communications.
