= Advances in Radio Science =

- Discipline: Radio science, radio-frequency engineering
- Language: English, German
- Edited by: Ludger Klinkenbusch

Publication details
- History: 2003-present
- Publisher: Copernicus Publications on behalf of the German National Committee of the International Union of Radio Science
- Open access: Yes
- License: Creative Commons Attribution 3.0 License
- Impact factor: 0.6 (2023)

Standard abbreviations
- ISO 4: Adv. Radio Sci.

Indexing
- ISSN: 1684-9973 (print); 1991-9603 (web)
- OCLC no.: 67014552

Links
- Journal homepage; Online archive

Advances in Radio Science is a peer-reviewed open access scientific journal published by the German National Committee of the International Union of Radio Science. It covers radio science and radio-frequency engineering. It was established in 2003 and its current editors-in-chief is Ludger Klinkenbusch (Kiel University).

== Abstracting and indexing ==
The journal is abstracted and indexed in:

- Directory of Open Access Journals
- EBSCO databases
- Emerging Sources Citation Index
- Ei Compendex
- ProQuest databases
- Scopus

According to the Journal Citation Reports, the journal has a 2023 impact factor of 2.2.

== See also ==
- Radio Science
