= Malcolm Lewis Heron =

Australian electrical engineer

Malcolm Lewis Heron is an electrical engineer at James Cook University in Townsville, Queensland, Australia.

Heron has a doctorate from the University of Auckland, completed in 1971, on refraction of satellite signals.

He was named a Fellow of the Institute of Electrical and Electronics Engineers (IEEE) in 2012 for his contributions to the application of radio science to oceanic and terrestrial remote sensing.
