= Radio-frequency microelectromechanical system =

Fig. 1: (a) A capacitive fixed-fixed beam RF MEMS switch, connected in shunt to a CPW line. (b) An ohmic cantilever RF MEMS switch, connected in series to a microstrip line.

A radio-frequency microelectromechanical system (RF MEMS) is a microelectromechanical system with electronic components comprising moving sub-millimeter-sized parts that provide radio-frequency (RF) functionality. RF functionality can be implemented using a variety of RF technologies. Besides RF MEMS technology, III-V compound semiconductor (GaAs, GaN, InP, InSb), ferrite, ferroelectric, silicon-based semiconductor (RF CMOS, SiC and SiGe), and vacuum tube technology are available to the RF designer. Each of the RF technologies offers a distinct trade-off between cost, frequency, gain, large-scale integration, lifetime, linearity, noise figure, packaging, power handling, power consumption, reliability, ruggedness, size, supply voltage, switching time and weight.

== Components ==
There are various types of RF MEMS components, such as CMOS integrable RF MEMS resonators and self-sustained oscillators with small form factor and low phase noise, RF MEMS tunable inductors, and RF MEMS switches, switched capacitors and varactors.

=== Switches, switched capacitors and varactors ===
The components discussed in this article are based on RF MEMS switches, switched capacitors and varactors. These components can be used instead of FET and HEMT switches (FET and HEMT transistors in common gate configuration), and PIN diodes. RF MEMS switches, switched capacitors and varactors are classified by actuation method (electrostatic, electrothermal, magnetostatic, piezoelectric), by axis of deflection (lateral, vertical), by circuit configuration (series, shunt), by clamp configuration (cantilever, fixed-fixed beam), or by contact interface (capacitive, ohmic). Electrostatically actuated RF MEMS components offer low insertion loss and high isolation, linearity, power handling and Q factor, do not consume power, but require a high control voltage and hermetic single-chip packaging (thin film capping, LCP or LTCC packaging) or wafer-level packaging (anodic or glass frit wafer bonding).

RF MEMS switches were pioneered by IBM Research Laboratory, San Jose, CA, Hughes Research Laboratories, Malibu, CA, Northeastern University in cooperation with Analog Devices, Boston, MA, Raytheon, Dallas, TX, and Rockwell Science, Thousand Oaks, CA. A capacitive fixed-fixed beam RF MEMS switch, as shown in Fig. 1(a), is in essence a micro-machined capacitor with a moving top electrode, which is the beam. It is generally connected in shunt with the transmission line and used in X- to W-band (77 GHz and 94 GHz) RF MEMS components. An ohmic cantilever RF MEMS switch, as shown in Fig. 1(b), is capacitive in the up-state, but makes an ohmic contact in the down-state. It is generally connected in series with the transmission line and is used in DC to the Ka-band components.

From an electromechanical perspective, the components behave like a damped mass-spring system, actuated by an electrostatic force. The spring constant is a function of the dimensions of the beam, as well as the Young's modulus, the residual stress and the Poisson ratio of the beam material. The electrostatic force is a function of the capacitance and the bias voltage. Knowledge of the spring constant allows for hand calculation of the pull-in voltage, which is the bias voltage necessary to pull-in the beam, whereas knowledge of the spring constant and the mass allows for hand calculation of the switching time.

From an RF perspective, the components behave like a series RLC circuit with negligible resistance and inductance. The up- and down-state capacitance are in the order of 50 fF and 1.2 pF, which are functional values for millimeter-wave circuit design. Switches typically have a capacitance ratio of 30 or higher, while switched capacitors and varactors have a capacitance ratio of about 1.2 to 10. The loaded Q factor is between 20 and 50 in the X-, Ku- and Ka-band.

RF MEMS switched capacitors are capacitive fixed-fixed beam switches with a low capacitance ratio. RF MEMS varactors are capacitive fixed-fixed beam switches which are biased below pull-in voltage. Other examples of RF MEMS switches are ohmic cantilever switches, and capacitive single pole N throw (SPNT) switches based on the axial gap wobble motor.

== Biasing ==
RF MEMS components are biased electrostatically using a bipolar NRZ drive voltage, as shown in Fig. 2, in order to avoid dielectric charging and to increase the lifetime of the device. Dielectric charges exert a permanent electrostatic force on the beam. The use of a bipolar NRZ drive voltage instead of a DC drive voltage avoids dielectric charging whereas the electrostatic force exerted on the beam is maintained, because the electrostatic force varies quadratically with the DC drive voltage. Electrostatic biasing implies no current flow, allowing high-resistivity bias lines to be used instead of RF chokes.

Fig. 2: Electrostatic biasing of a capacitive fixed-fixed beam RF MEMS switch, switched capacitor or varactor.

== Packaging ==
RF MEMS components are fragile and require wafer level packaging or single chip packaging which allow for hermetic cavity sealing. A cavity is required to allow movement, whereas hermeticity is required to prevent cancellation of the spring force by the Van der Waals force exerted by water droplets and other contaminants on the beam. RF MEMS switches, switched capacitors and varactors can be packaged using wafer level packaging. Large monolithic RF MEMS filters, phase shifters, and tunable matching networks require single chip packaging.

Wafer-level packaging is implemented before wafer dicing, as shown in Fig. 3(a), and is based on anodic, metal diffusion, metal eutectic, glass frit, polymer adhesive, and silicon fusion wafer bonding. The selection of a wafer-level packaging technique is based on balancing the thermal expansion coefficients of the material layers of the RF MEMS component and those of the substrates to minimize the wafer bow and the residual stress, as well as on alignment and hermeticity requirements. Figures of merit for wafer-level packaging techniques are chip size, hermeticity, processing temperature, (in)tolerance to alignment errors and surface roughness. Anodic and silicon fusion bonding do not require an intermediate layer, but do not tolerate surface roughness. Wafer-level packaging techniques based on a bonding technique with a conductive intermediate layer (conductive split ring) restrict the bandwidth and isolation of the RF MEMS component. The most common wafer-level packaging techniques are based on anodic and glass frit wafer bonding. Wafer-level packaging techniques, enhanced with vertical interconnects, offer the opportunity of three-dimensional integration.

Single-chip packaging, as shown in Fig. 3(b), is implemented after wafer dicing, using pre-fabricated ceramic or organic packages, such as LCP injection molded packages or LTCC packages. Pre-fabricated packages require hermetic cavity sealing through clogging, shedding, soldering or welding. Figures of merit for single-chip packaging techniques are chip size, hermeticity, and processing temperature.

Fig. 3: (a) Wafer-level packaging. (b) Single chip packaging of an ohmic cantilever RF MEMS switch.

== Microfabrication ==
An RF MEMS fabrication process is based on surface micromachining techniques, and allows for integration of SiCr or TaN thin film resistors (TFR), metal-air-metal (MAM) capacitors, metal-insulator-metal (MIM) capacitors, and RF MEMS components. An RF MEMS fabrication process can be realized on a variety of wafers: III-V compound semi-insulating, borosilicate glass, fused silica (quartz), LCP, sapphire, and passivated silicon wafers. As shown in Fig. 4, RF MEMS components can be fabricated in class 100 clean rooms using 6 to 8 optical lithography steps with a 5 μm contact alignment error, whereas state-of-the-art MMIC and RFIC fabrication processes require 13 to 25 lithography steps.

Fig. 4: RF MEMS switch, switched capacitor, or varactor fabrication process

As outlined in Fig. 4, the essential microfabrication steps are:

- Deposition of the bias lines (Fig. 4, step 1)
- Deposition of the electrode layer (Fig. 4, step 2)
- Deposition of the dielectric layer (Fig. 4, step 3)
- Deposition of the sacrificial spacer (Fig. 4, step 4)
- Deposition of seed layer and subsequent electroplating (Fig. 4, step 5)
- Beam patterning, release and critical point drying (Fig. 4, step 6)

With the exception of the removal of the sacrificial spacer, which requires critical point drying, the fabrication steps are similar to CMOS fabrication process steps. RF MEMS fabrication processes, unlike BST or PZT ferroelectric and MMIC fabrication processes, do not require electron beam lithography, MBE, or MOCVD.

== Reliability ==
Contact interface degradation poses a reliability issue for ohmic cantilever RF MEMS switches, whereas dielectric charging beam stiction, as shown in Fig. 5(a), and humidity induced beam stiction, as shown in Fig. 5(b), pose a reliability issue for capacitive fixed-fixed beam RF MEMS switches. Stiction is the inability of the beam to release after removal of the drive voltage. A high contact pressure assures a low-ohmic contact or alleviates dielectric charging induced beam stiction. Commercially available ohmic cantilever RF MEMS switches and capacitive fixed-fixed beam RF MEMS switches have demonstrated lifetimes in excess of 100 billion cycles at 100 mW of RF input power. Reliability issues pertaining to high-power operation are discussed in the limiter section.

Fig. 5: (a) [Bottom] Dielectric charging induced beam stiction. (b) [Top] Humidity induced beam stiction.

== Applications ==
RF MEMS resonators are applied in filters and reference oscillators. RF MEMS switches, switched capacitors and varactors are applied in electronically scanned (sub)arrays (phase shifters) and software-defined radios (reconfigurable antennas, tunable band-pass filters).

=== Antennas ===
Polarization and radiation pattern reconfigurability, and frequency tunability, are usually achieved by incorporation of III-V semiconductor components, such as SPST switches or varactor diodes. However, these components can be readily replaced by RF MEMS switches and varactors in order to take advantage of the low insertion loss and high Q factor offered by RF MEMS technology. In addition, RF MEMS components can be integrated monolithically on low-loss dielectric substrates, such as borosilicate glass, fused silica or LCP, whereas III-V compound semi-insulating and passivated silicon substrates are generally lossier and have a higher dielectric constant. A low loss tangent and low dielectric constant are of importance for the efficiency and the bandwidth of the antenna.

The prior art includes an RF MEMS frequency tunable fractal antenna for the 0.1–6 GHz frequency range, and the actual integration of RF MEMS switches on a self-similar Sierpinski gasket antenna to increase its number of resonant frequencies, extending its range to 8 GHz, 14 GHz and 25 GHz, an RF MEMS radiation pattern reconfigurable spiral antenna for 6 and 10 GHz, an RF MEMS radiation pattern reconfigurable spiral antenna for the 6–7 GHz frequency band based on packaged Radant MEMS SPST-RMSW100 switches, an RF MEMS multiband Sierpinski fractal antenna, again with integrated RF MEMS switches, functioning at different bands from 2.4 to 18 GHz, and a 2-bit Ka-band RF MEMS frequency tunable slot antenna.

The Samsung Omnia W was the first smart phone to include a RF MEMS antenna.

=== Filters ===
RF bandpass filters can be used to increase out-of-band rejection, in case the antenna fails to provide sufficient selectivity. Out-of-band rejection eases the dynamic range requirement on the LNA and the mixer in the light of interference. Off-chip RF bandpass filters based on lumped bulk acoustic wave (BAW), ceramic, SAW, quartz crystal, and FBAR resonators have superseded distributed RF bandpass filters based on transmission line resonators, printed on substrates with low loss tangent, or based on waveguide cavities.

Tunable RF bandpass filters offer a significant size reduction over switched RF bandpass filter banks. They can be implemented using III-V semiconducting varactors, BST or PZT ferroelectric and RF MEMS resonators and switches, switched capacitors and varactors, and YIG ferrites. RF MEMS resonators offer the potential of on-chip integration of high-Q resonators and low-loss bandpass filters. The Q factor of RF MEMS resonators is in the order of 100–1000. RF MEMS switch, switched capacitor and varactor technology, offers the tunable filter designer a compelling trade-off between insertion loss, linearity, power consumption, power handling, size, and switching time.

=== Phase shifters ===
Fig. 6: EIRP x G_{r}/T

Fig. 7: EIRP versus number of antenna elements in a passive subarray.

Passive subarrays based on RF MEMS phase shifters may be used to lower the amount of T/R modules in an active electronically scanned array. The statement is illustrated with examples in Fig. 6: assume a one-by-eight passive subarray is used for transmit as well as receive, with following characteristics: f = 38 GHz, G_{r} = G_{t} = 10 dBi, BW = 2 GHz, P_{t} = 4 W. The low loss (6.75 ps/dB) and good power handling (500 mW) of the RF MEMS phase shifters allow an EIRP of 40 W and a G_{r}/T of 0.036 1/K. EIRP, also referred to as the power-aperture product, is the product of the transmit gain, G_{t}, and the transmit power, P_{t}. G_{r}/T is the quotient of the receive gain and the antenna noise temperature. A high EIRP and G_{r}/T are a prerequisite for long-range detection. The EIRP and G_{r}/T are a function of the number of antenna elements per subarray and of the maximum scanning angle. The number of antenna elements per subarray should be chosen in order to optimize the EIRP or the EIRP x G_{r}/T product, as shown in Fig. 7 and Fig. 8. The radar range equation can be used to calculate the maximum range for which targets can be detected with 10 dB of SNR at the input of the receiver.

$${\mathrm{R = \sqrt[4]{\frac{\displaystyle {\mathrm{\lambda^2 \, EIRP \, G_R/T \, \sigma}}}{{\mathrm{\displaystyle 64 \, \pi^3 \, k_B \, BW \, SNR}}}}}}$$

in which k_{B} is the Boltzmann constant, λ is the free-space wavelength, and σ is the RCS of the target. Range values are tabulated in Table 1 for following targets: a sphere with a radius, a, of 10 cm (σ = π a^{2}), a dihedral corner reflector with facet size, a, of 10 cm (σ = 12 a^{4}/λ^{2}), the rear of a car (σ = 20 m^{2}) and for a non-evasive fighter jet (σ = 400 m^{2}).

Table 1: Maximum Detectable Range (SNR = 10 dB)
	RCS (m^{2})	Range (m)
Sphere	0.0314	10
Rear of Car	20	51
Dihedral Corner Reflector	60.9	67
Fighter Jet	400	107

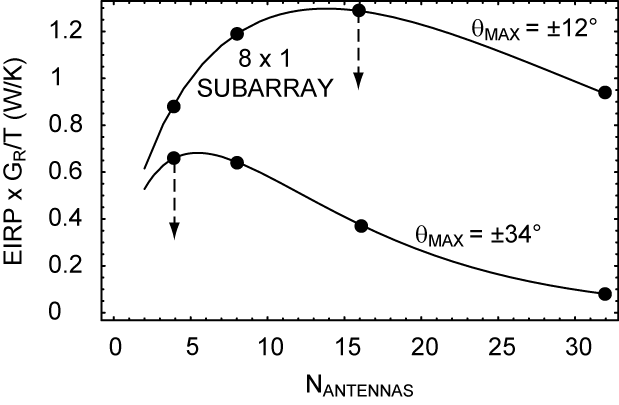
Fig. 8: EIRP x G_{r}/T versus number of antenna elements in a passive subarray.

RF MEMS phase shifters enable wide-angle passive electronically scanned arrays, such as lens arrays, reflect arrays, subarrays and switched beamforming networks, with high EIRP and high G_{r}/T. The prior art in passive electronically scanned arrays, includes an X-band continuous transverse stub (CTS) array fed by a line source synthesized by sixteen 5-bit reflect-type RF MEMS phase shifters based on ohmic cantilever RF MEMS switches, an X-band 2-D lens array consisting of parallel-plate waveguides and featuring 25,000 ohmic cantilever RF MEMS switches, and a W-band switched beamforming network based on an RF MEMS SP4T switch and a Rotman lens focal plane scanner.

The usage of true-time-delay TTD phase shifters instead of RF MEMS phase shifters allows UWB radar waveforms with associated high range resolution, and avoids beam squinting or frequency scanning. TTD phase shifters are designed using the switched-line principle or the distributed loaded-line principle. Switched-line TTD phase shifters outperform distributed loaded-line TTD phase shifters in terms of time delay per decibel NF, especially at frequencies up to X-band, but are inherently digital and require low-loss and high-isolation SPNT switches. Distributed loaded-line TTD phase shifters, however, can be realized analogously or digitally, and in smaller form factors, which is important at the subarray level. Analog phase shifters are biased through a single bias line, whereas multibit digital phase shifters require a parallel bus along with complex routing schemes at the subarray level.

== Reading ==
- S. Lucyszyn (Ed), "Advanced RF MEMS", Cambridge University Press, Aug. 2010, ISBN 978-0-521-89771-6
