= Radio Science =

- Discipline: Radio science
- Language: English
- Edited by: Kazuya Kobayashi

Publication details
- Former names: Journal of Research of the National Bureau of Standards, Section D: Radio Science (1964-1965); Journal of Research of the National Bureau of Standards, Section D: Radio Propagation (1959-1963)
- History: 1966–present
- Publisher: Wiley-Blackwell on behalf of the American Geophysical Union and the International Union of Radio Science (United States)
- Frequency: Quarterly
- Impact factor: 1.6 (2023)

Standard abbreviations
- ISO 4: Radio Sci.

Indexing
- CODEN: RASCAD
- ISSN: 0048-6604 (print); 1944-799X (web)
- LCCN: 86642786
- OCLC no.: 53479878

Links
- Journal homepage; Online archive

Radio Science is a quarterly peer-reviewed scientific journal published by Wiley-Blackwell on behalf of the American Geophysical Union and co-sponsored by the International Union of Radio Science. It contains original scientific contributions on radio-frequency electromagnetic propagation and its applications (radio science). Its full aims and scope read:

Contributions covering measurement, modelling, prediction and forecasting techniques pertinent to fields and waves - including antennas, signals and systems, the terrestrial and space environment and radio propagation problems in radio astronomy - are welcome. Contributions may address propagation through, interaction with, and remote sensing of structures, geophysical media, plasmas, and materials, as well as the application of radio frequency electromagnetic techniques to remote sensing of the Earth and other bodies in the solar system.

Volumes for the years 1966 through 1968 were issued by the Environmental Science Services Administration (ESSA), the precursor of the National Oceanic and Atmospheric Administration (NOAA), in cooperation with the United States National Committee of the International Scientific Radio Union.

== Abstracting and indexing ==
The journal is abstracted and indexed in:

- Current Contents/Engineering, Computing & Technology
- Current Contents/Engineering, Physical, Chemical & Earth Sciences
- Ei Compendex
- Inspec
- ProQuest databases
- Science Citation Index Expanded
- Scopus
- Zentralblatt Math

According to the Journal Citation Reports, the journal has a 2023 impact factor of 1.6.

== See also ==
- Advances in Radio Science
