= Alpine planetary boundary layer =

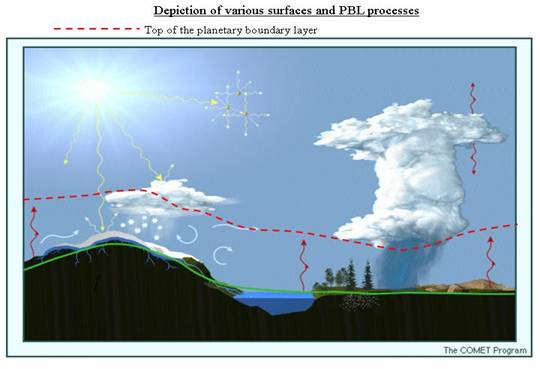
PBL over a mountainous terrain (left hand side) vs. a flat terrain (right hand side)

The alpine planetary boundary layer is the planetary boundary layer (PBL) associated with mountainous regions. Due to its high spatial and temporal variability, its behavior is more complex than over a flat terrain. The fast changing local wind system directly linked to topography and the variable land cover that goes from snow to vegetation have a significant effect on the growth of the PBL and make it much harder to predict.

Understanding the processes inducing changes in the mountain PBL have critical applications for predicting air pollution transport, fire weather and local intense thunderstorm events. While some processes, such as mountain waves, have been well studied in the mountain PBL due to their importance for aviation, most of the behaviors of the alpine PBL are relatively unknown.

== Wind systems ==
The PBL in complex terrain is shaped by three local (non synoptic) wind systems occurring at different scales, which are closely related to the structure of the topography. The height of the PBL can be observed using radio soundings, which measure temperature and humidity gradients or LIDAR, which measures the backscatters of the aerosols.

=== Mountain-Plain winds ===
The Mountain-Plain winds system is the largest scale phenomenon going across the mountain range.

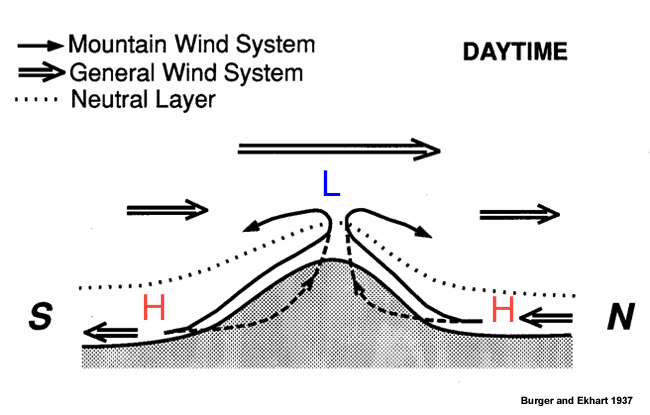
Daytime mountain-plain wind system

During daytime, incoming solar radiation heats up the mountain top faster than the plain, creating a mean low pressure zone at the top. Winds then blow towards the mountain on all sides, flow up the slope and converge at the top. A return flow occurs aloft and comes back down into the plains. The exact opposite happens during nighttime, when the top cools down faster than the plain, which creates a mean high pressure zone leading to winds coming from the mountain top down to the plain. This represents the idealized situation since many complications can arise from cross currents, forced or pressure driven channeling or even cold fronts approaching the mountain barrier.

=== Valley winds ===
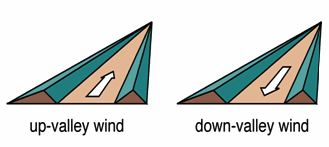
Up-valley winds during the day and down-valley winds at night.

Valley winds are best developed on clear summer days and are driven by horizontal pressure gradients. During the day, the valley is warmer than the flat terrain (because it contains a smaller volume of air receiving the same amount of radiation), which creates a lower pressure zone over the valley, entraining the air from the plains up to the valley. The opposite process occurs at nighttime, where the valley cools faster and the air flows back down to the plains .

=== Slope winds ===
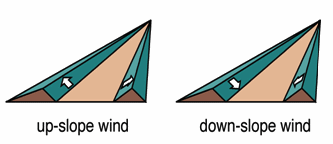
Up-slope winds during the day and down-slope winds at night.

Slope-winds are produced by the temperature gradient between the valley and the air layer aloft. During daytime, the air above the valley on the slopes is warmer than at the bottom (due to a more direct exposure to incoming radiation), which leads to upslope flows converging at the ridge tops (and can lead to cloud formation depending on the humidity of the air parcel). At night, the air above the valley cools down faster than the surface leading to down-slope motion. This means that a temperature inversion occurs at night. The temperature increases from the bottom of the valley to the ridge top and then starts decreasing only when the air parcel is free from the influence of the topography. Again, this ideal circulation can often vary due to the complex topography. Insulation of the slopes is affected by shade, aspect and sky view factor, which is the portion of the visible sky not obscured by the relief. For instance, east facing slopes receive radiation earlier in the morning than west facing slopes, which affects how the PBL grows with time and space. A very good example of down-slope winds are the Santa Ana winds, which are dry and warm winds coming from the Great Basin and Mojave desert down to coastal South California.

== PBL growth due to wind systems ==
=== Diurnal variation ===
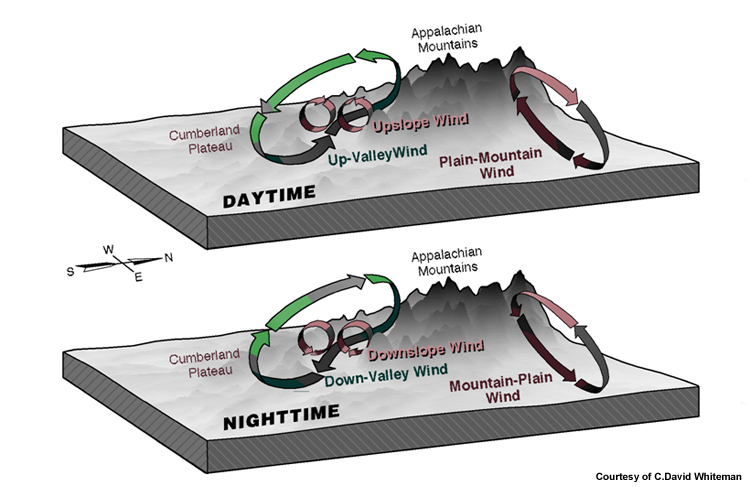
Diurnal wind system variation in the appalachian mountain range.

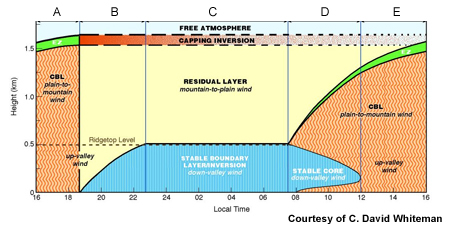
Diurnal variation of the PBL over a mountainous terrain.

Overall, plain to mountain, up-valley and up-slope winds occurring during the day locally increase the height of the PBL. The PBL starts rising on the east facing slopes and near the ridges (warmed up by sun first and not hindered by pockets of cold air accumulated down the valley over night) and becomes more spatially homogeneous during the afternoon. Temporally speaking, the convection ends around the early evening. Clouds then starts dissipating and the Mountain-Plain circulation starts reversing into a sinking motion. The transition builds up from the surface and becomes deeper and deeper with time. The morning transition is slightly different and is the result of the combination of both the growth of the PBL and the sinking of the nocturnal temperature inversion. At nighttime, there is a limited residual layer since advection by the mountain synoptic wind system dominates.

=== Mountain venting ===
The daytime increase of the PBL from up-slope winds is called mountain venting. This phenomenon can sometimes cause a vertical exchange of the PBL air into the free troposphere. Similarly to the daytime situation, during summer the top of the mountain is warmer than its surroundings creating a low pressure zone. Winds then blow up from the plains to the mountain top, which is an efficient lifting mechanism to carry PBL pollutants into the free atmosphere.

== Effect of landcover ==
Besides wind systems, the variation in land cover also plays a significant role in the PBL growth. Bare or rocky soils are not the only land cover types found in high elevation, a more complex combination of snow and/or ice and/or vegetation is often observed. On such surfaces, the radiation energy budget is highly temporally and spatially variable and so is the growth of the PBL.

=== Snow ===
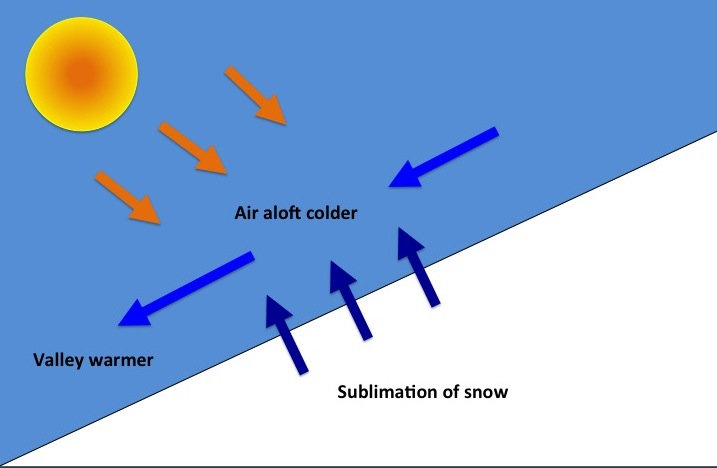
Snow sublimates and creates a cold layer directly above the surface, which leads to winds blowing down-slope.

Due to wind, fresh snow does not stay at the surface but is blown into the first few meters of the surface layer. This blowing snow usually sublimates due to the insulation and has a significant meteorological effect . The sublimation of blowing snow leads to a modification of the energy budget and an overall temperature decrease of 0.5 °C combined to an increase of water vapor has been observed. This forms a stable cold and moist layer of air above the snow surface, even if the surrounding air temperature is above freezing point. This cold layer induces downslope winds, which damper the growth of the PBL. This surface winds are also drifting the snowpack, leading to an increase of surface roughness and therefore an increase of wind shear (Forced convection).

=== Vegetation ===
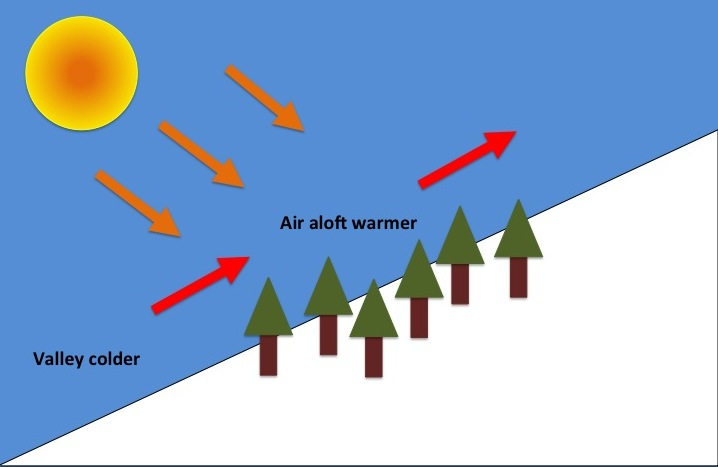
The canopy top reflects a significant part of the incoming solar radiation, which warms up the air layer above.

Low vegetation cover such as grass or shrubs are usually covered by snow during winter time or at very high elevations and the modification in surface roughness is therefore of a limited magnitude. However, dense and high forests have a significant effect on surface roughness and also on the energy budget. The turbulence created by the vegetation canopy increases the forced convection in the surface layer. The top of the canopy has a tendency to warm up faster than the air at the bottom of the valley creating upslope wind conditions just from the presence of vegetation.

To summarize, the presence of snow creates down-slope winds hindering the growth of the PBL while the presence of forest creates up-slope winds facilitating the growth of the PBL.
