= Self-complementary antenna =

Type of antenna

The self-complementary antenna (SCA) is a basic antenna for extremely broadband practical antennas. This antenna is an arbitrarily shaped antenna which is constituted with a half of an infinitely extended planar-sheet conductor such that the shape of its complementary structure is exactly identical, or "self-complementary" with that of the original structure with two terminals for the simplest case. The self-complementary antenna has constant input impedance independent of the source frequency and the shape of the structure.

The type of the self-complementary antenna is not limited only to the case of a planar antenna with two terminals, but there are more general types with various grades of complexity, such as, the number of terminals, the number of reference planes, and others. Moreover, there is infinite freedom in their shapes of the structures. They also have constant-impedance property independent of the source frequency and the shape of the structure for respective classes of structures with various grades of complexity. This general principle of self-complementarity is also called the "Mushiake Principle" by various sources.

Examples for two shapes of the structures are shown in the attached figures. The structures 1 to 3 are for square shape, and the structures 4 to 6 are spiral shape. Actually, the structures extend infinitely, but the figures show only finite portions near the feed point of each structure.

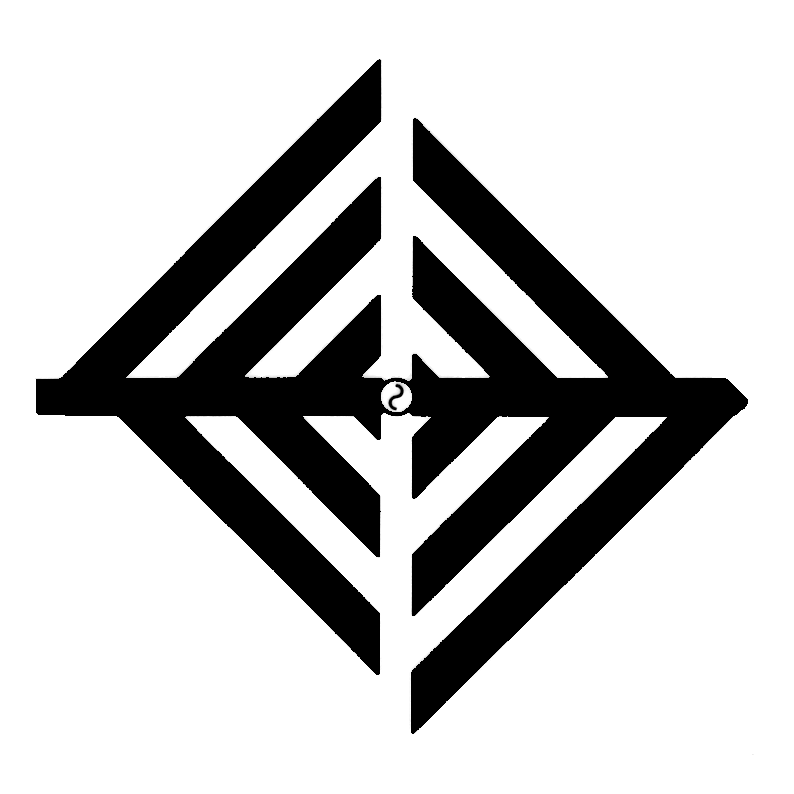
Explanation of SCA structure 1

Explanation of SCA structure.2

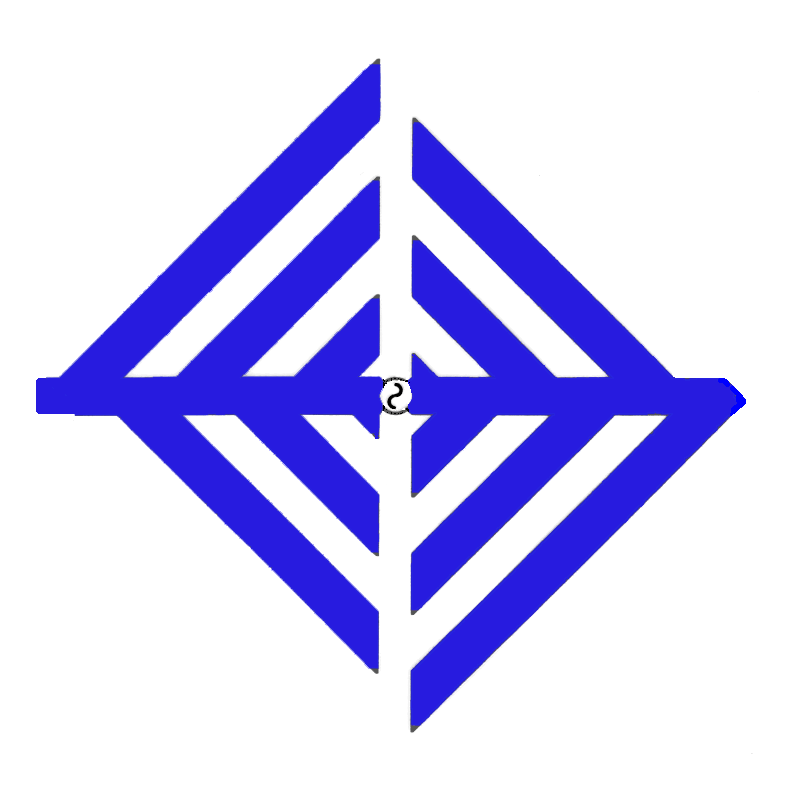
Explanation of SCA structure.3

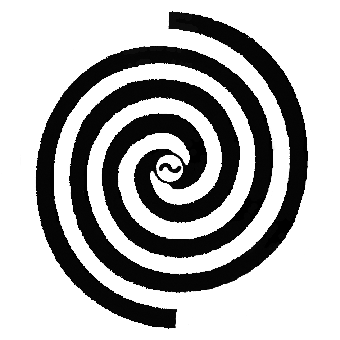
Explanation of SCA structure.4

Explanation of SCA structure.5

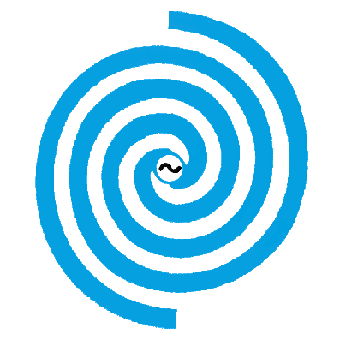
Explanation of SCA structure.6

The equation which gives the constant value of the input impedance for self-complementary antenna is called the "Mushiake Relationship". The values of the constant-impedance for various classes of complexity in the self-complementary structures depend on the respective grades of the complexity. For example, the Mushiake relationship for the simplest self-complementary planar antenna with two terminals is expressed as:

Z = Z_{0}/2≒188.4 [Ω], (Mushiake relationship)

where Z is the input impedance of the antenna, and Z_{0} is the intrinsic impedance of the medium.

Moreover, experimental studies on self-complementary antennas, including radiation properties, are conducted in Japan. As the results of the experiment, it is found that the truncated alternate-leaves type self-complementary antenna (or Square SCA) has practically omnidirectional radiation pattern as well as the broadband property.

== Comparison with log-periodic antennas ==
The log-periodic antenna is a modified, folded up, square self-complementary antenna with log-periodic shape, and the original structure before its modification has a typical self-complementary shape. The log-periodic shape does not provide the broadband property for antennas. This fact is experimentally proven. It is also evident from the IEEE definition of "Log-Periodic Antenna". The "Log-Periodic Dipole Array" or "Log-Periodic Dipole Antenna" (LPDA), is a practically modified self-complementary antenna. LPDA has transposed excitation for the dipole array resulted from folding up the antenna structure to obtain unidirectional radiation, that is inevitable outcome of the modification.

In connection with the book Self-complementary Antennas published at the Springer-Verlag in London, is mentioned here, Springer Book Archives should be shown around here.

The log-periodic structure failed to provide constant-impedance property for antennas over one period. However, one certain way to eliminate such variation is to make the shape self-complementary, and the expression for the constant impedance is called "Mushiake's relation" by V. H. Rumsey.

Accordingly, LPDA is actually a Modified Self-complementary Dipole Array (MSCDA) with log-periodic shape. Where the self-complementary shape has infinite freedom and further evolution is expected for general type of broadband dipole array, MSCDA. For example, with recent widespread Wi-Fi utilization, this type of broadband MSCDA is found, including so-called LPDA, at the Wi-Fi access points.

Furthermore, "Discovery of the Principle of Self-Complementarity in Antennas and the Mushiake Relationship, 1948" was recognized as IEEE Milestone July 2017, without mentioning the needless term "log-periodic shape" for that recognition. Moreover, to be proposed as an IEEE Milestone, an achievement must be at least 25 years old, have benefited humanity, and must have had at least regional importance. This IEEE Milestone was dedicated to Tohoku University, Japan, and detailed explanation can be found in the List of Milestones, or more easily found in.

== See also ==
- Dipole antenna
- Fractal antenna
