= Fractal antenna =

Antenna with a fractal shape

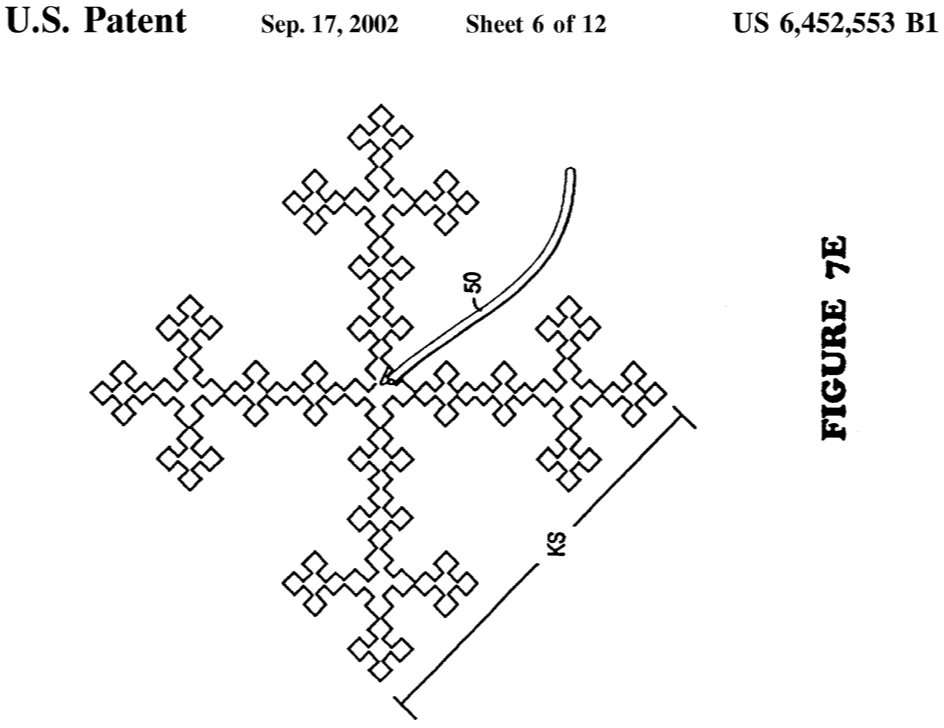
An example of a fractal antenna: a space-filling curve called a "Minkowski Island" or "Minkowski fractal"

A fractal antenna is an antenna that uses a fractal, self-similar design to maximize the effective length, or increase the perimeter (on inside sections or the outer structure), of material that can receive or transmit electromagnetic radiation within a given total surface area or volume.

Such fractal antennas are also referred to as multilevel and space filling curves, but the key aspect lies in their repetition of a motif over two or more scale sizes, or "iterations". For this reason, fractal antennas are very compact, multiband or wideband, and have useful applications in cellular telephone and microwave communications. A fractal antenna's response differs markedly from traditional antenna designs, in that it is capable of operating with good-to-excellent performance at many different frequencies simultaneously. Normally, standard antennas have to be "cut" for the frequency for which they are to be used—and thus the standard antennas only work well at that frequency.

In addition, the fractal nature of the antenna shrinks its size, without the use of any extra components such as inductors or capacitors.

== Log-periodic antennas ==
Log-periodic antennas are arrays invented in 1952 and commonly seen as TV antennas. This was long before Mandelbrot coined the word fractal in 1975. Some authors (for instance Cohen) consider log-periodic antennas to be an early form of fractal antenna due to their infinite self similarity at all scales. However, they have a finite length even in the theoretical limit with an infinite number of elements and therefore do not have a fractal dimension that exceeds their topological dimension – which is one way of defining fractals. More typically, (for instance Pandey) authors treat them as a separate but related class of antenna.

== Performance ==
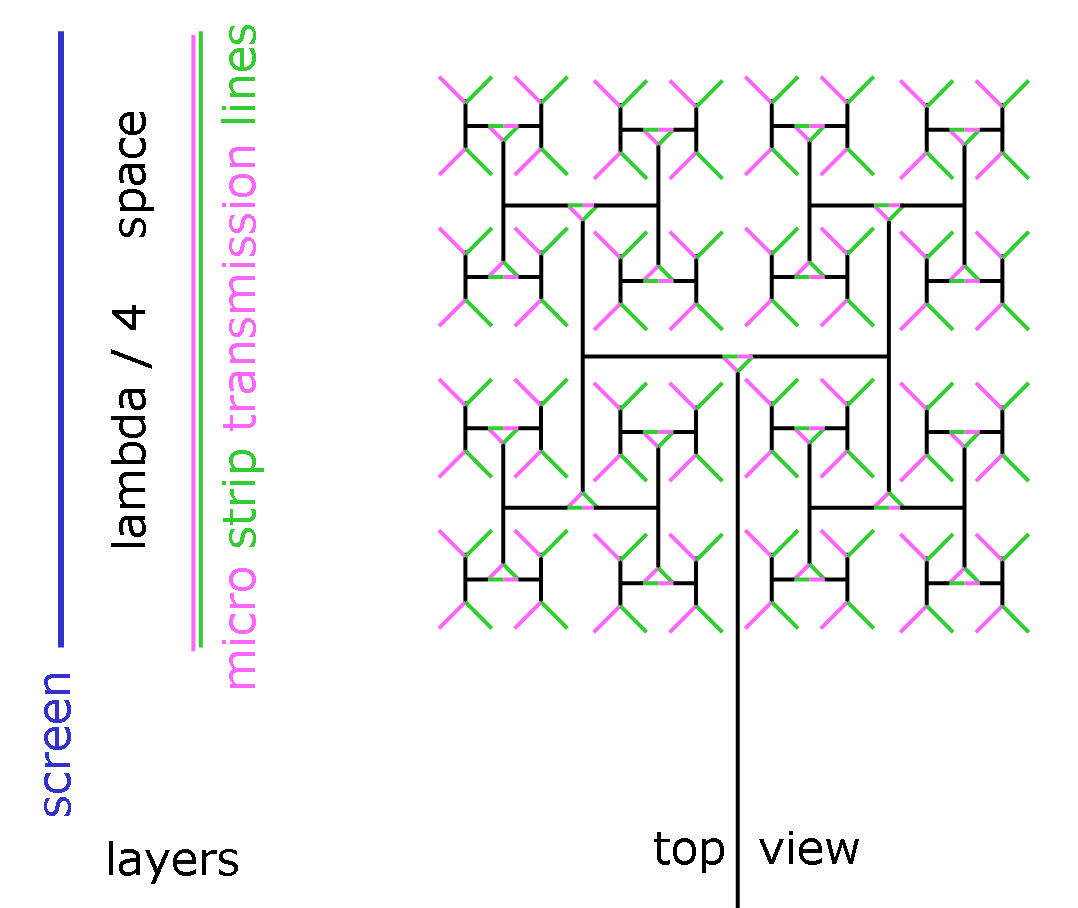
A planar array fractal antenna (H tree)

Antenna elements (as opposed to antenna arrays, which are usually not included as fractal antennas) made from self-similar shapes were first created by Nathan Cohen then a professor at Boston University, starting in 1988. Cohen's efforts with a variety of fractal antenna designs were first published in 1995, which marked the inaugural scientific publication on fractal antennas.

Many fractal element antennas use the fractal structure as a virtual combination of capacitors and inductors. This makes the antenna so that it has many different resonances, which can be chosen and adjusted by choosing the proper fractal design. This complexity arises because the current on the structure has a complex arrangement caused by the inductance and self capacitance. In general, although their effective electrical length is longer, the fractal element antennas are themselves physically smaller, again due to this reactive loading.

Thus, fractal element antennas are shrunken compared to conventional designs and do not need additional components, assuming the structure happens to have the desired resonant input impedance. In general, the fractal dimension of a fractal antenna is a poor predictor of its performance and application. Not all fractal antennas work well for a given application or set of applications. Computer search methods and antenna simulations are commonly used to identify which fractal antenna designs best meet the needs of the application.

Studies during the 2000s showed advantages of the fractal element technology in real-life applications, such as RFID and cell phones. Fractals have been used commercially in antennas since the 2010s. Their advantages are good multiband performance, wide bandwidth, and small area. The gain with small size results from constructive interference with multiple current maxima, afforded by the electrically long structure in a small area.

Some researchers have disputed that fractal antennas have superior performance. S.R. Best (2003) observed "that antenna geometry alone, fractal or otherwise, does not uniquely determine the electromagnetic properties of the small antenna". Hansen & Collin (2011) reviewed many papers on fractal antennas and concluded that they offer no advantage over fat dipoles, loaded dipoles, or simple loops, and that non-fractals are always better. Balanis (2011) reported on several fractal antennas and found them equivalent in performance to the electrically small antennas they were compared to. Log periodics, a form of fractal antenna, have their electromagnetic characteristics uniquely determined by geometry, via an opening angle.

== Frequency invariance and Maxwell's equations ==
One different and useful attribute of some fractal element antennas is their self-scaling aspect. In 1957, V.H. Rumsey presented results that angle-defined scaling was one of the underlying requirements to make antennas invariant (have same radiation properties) at a number, or range, of frequencies. Work by Y. Mushiake in Japan starting in 1948 demonstrated a similar result of self-complementary antennas being frequency independent.

It was believed that antennas had to be defined by angles for this to be true, but in 1999 it was discovered that self-similarity was the requirement to make antennas frequency and bandwidth invariant. Angle-defined antennas are self-similar, but other self-similar antennas are frequency independent although not angle-defined.

This analysis, based on Maxwell's equations, showed fractal antennas offer a closed-form and unique insight into the invariance properties of Maxwell's equations – a key aspect of electromagnetic phenomena – now known as the Hohlfeld-Cohen-Rumsey (HCR) principle. Mushiake's earlier work on self complementarity was shown to be limited to impedance smoothness, as expected from Babinet's principle, but not frequency invariance.

== Other uses ==
In addition to their use as antennas, fractals have also found application in other antenna system components, including loads, counterpoises, and ground planes.

Fractal inductors and fractal tuned circuits (fractal resonators) were also discovered and invented simultaneously with fractal element antennas. An emerging example of such is in metamaterials. A recent invention demonstrates using close-packed fractal resonators to make the first wideband metamaterial 'invisibility cloak' at microwave frequencies.

Fractal filters (a type of tuned circuit) are another example where the superiority of the fractal approach for smaller size and better rejection has been proven.

As fractals can be used as counterpoises, loads, ground planes, and filters, all parts that can be integrated with antennas, they are considered parts of some antenna systems and thus are discussed in the context of fractal antennas.

== See also ==
- Waveguide (electromagnetism)
