= Reconfigurable antenna =

Antenna capable of modifying its frequency and radiation properties dynamically

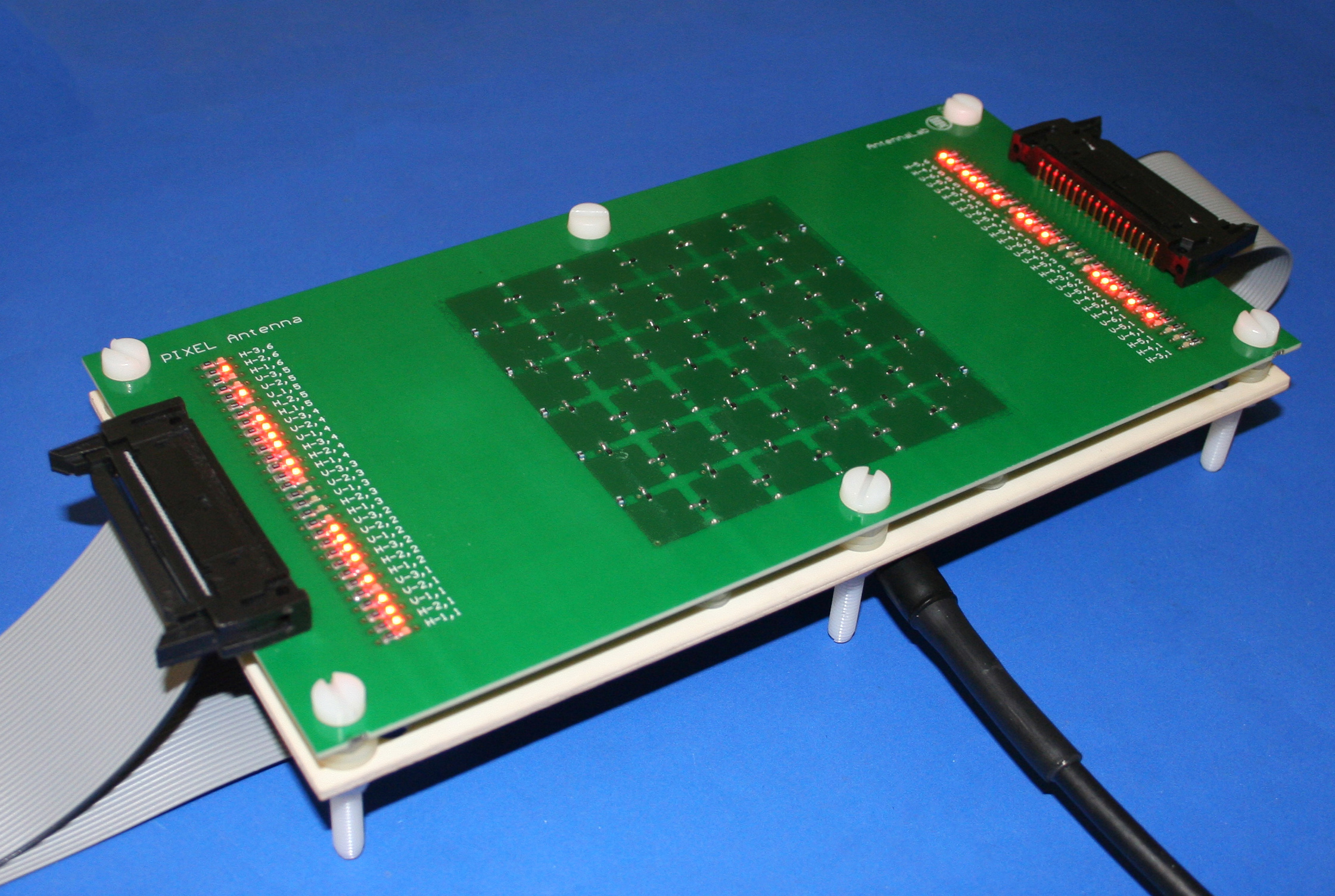
Reconfigurable antenna using a pixel architecture capable of reconfiguring dynamically its frequency of operation, radiation pattern and polarization.

A reconfigurable antenna is an antenna capable of modifying its frequency and radiation pattern dynamically, in a controlled and reversible manner. In order to provide a dynamic response, reconfigurable antennas integrate an inner mechanism (such as RF switches, varactors, mechanical actuators or tunable materials) that enable the intentional redistribution of the RF currents over the antenna surface and produce reversible modifications of its properties. Reconfigurable antennas differ from smart antennas because the reconfiguration mechanism lies inside the antenna, rather than in an external beamforming network. The reconfiguration capability of reconfigurable antennas is used to maximize the antenna performance in a changing scenario or to satisfy changing operating requirements.

== Types of antenna reconfiguration ==
Reconfigurable antennas can be classified according to the antenna parameter that is dynamically adjusted, typically the frequency of operation, radiation pattern or polarization.

=== Frequency reconfiguration ===
Frequency reconfigurable antennas can adjust their frequency of operation dynamically. They are particularly useful in situations where several communications systems converge because the multiple antennas required can be replaced by a single reconfigurable antenna. Frequency reconfiguration is generally achieved by physical or electrical modifications to the antenna dimensions using RF-switches, impedance loading or tunable materials.

=== Radiation pattern reconfiguration ===
Radiation pattern reconfigurability is based on the intentional modification of the spherical distribution of the radiation pattern. Beam steering is the most extended application and consists of steering the direction of maximum radiation to maximize the antenna gain in a link with mobile devices. Pattern reconfigurable antennas are usually designed using movable/rotatable structures or switchable and reactively-loaded parasitic elements. In the last 10 years, metamaterial-based reconfigurable antennas have gained attention due their small form factor, wide beam steering range and wireless applications. Plasma antennas have also been investigated as alternatives with tunable directivities.

=== Polarization reconfiguration ===
Polarization reconfigurable antennas are capable of switching between different polarization modes. The capability of switching between horizontal, vertical and circular polarizations can be used to reduce polarization mismatch losses in portable devices. Polarization reconfigurability can be provided by changing the balance between the different modes of a multimode structure.

=== Compound reconfiguration ===
Compound reconfiguration is the capability of simultaneously tuning several antenna parameters, for instance frequency and radiation pattern. The most common application of compound reconfiguration is the combination of frequency agility and beam-scanning to provide improved spectral efficiencies. Compound reconfigurability is achieved by combining in the same structure different single-parameter reconfiguration techniques or by reshaping dynamically a pixel surface.

== Reconfiguration techniques ==
There are different types of reconfiguration techniques for antennas. Mainly they are electrical (for example using RF-MEMS, PIN diodes, or varactors), optical, physical (mainly mechanical), and using materials. For the reconfiguration techniques using materials, the materials could be solid, liquid crystal, liquids (dielectric liquid or liquid metal).

== See also ==
- Antenna (radio)
- Beam steering
- Phased array
- RF MEMS
- Smart antenna
