= Radio science subsystem =

A radio science subsystem (RSS) is a subsystem placed on board a spacecraft for radio science purposes.

== Function of the RSS ==
The RSS uses radio signals to probe a medium such as a planetary atmosphere. The spacecraft transmits a highly stable signal to ground stations, receives such a signal from ground stations, or both. Since the transmitted signal parameters are accurately known to the receiver, any changes to these parameters are attributable to the propagation medium or to the relative motion of the spacecraft and ground station.

The RSS is usually not a separate instrument; its functions are usually "piggybacked" on the existing telecommunications subsystem. More advanced systems use multiple antennas with orthogonal polarizations.

== Applications ==
Radio science is commonly used to determine the gravity field of a moon or planet by observing Doppler shift. This requires a highly stable oscillator on the spacecraft, or more commonly a "2-way coherent" transponder that phase locks the transmitted signal frequency to a rational multiple of a received uplink signal that usually also carries spacecraft commands.

Another common radio science observation is in radio occultation, performed as a spacecraft is occulted by a planetary body. As the spacecraft moves behind the planet, its radio signals cuts through successively deeper layers of the planetary atmosphere. Measurements of signal strength and polarization vs time can yield data on the composition and temperature of the atmosphere at different altitudes.

It is also common to use multiple radio frequencies coherently derived from a common source to measure the dispersion of the propagation medium. This is especially useful in determining the free electron content of a planetary ionosphere.

== Spacecraft using RSS ==
- Cassini–Huygens
- Mariner 2, 4,5,6,7,9, and 10
- Voyager 1 and 2
- MESSENGER
- Venus Express

== Functions ==
- Determine composition of gas clouds such as atmospheres, solar coronas.
- Characterize gravitational fields
- Estimate masses of celestial satellites that do not have satellites of their own.
- To estimate particle size of particle fields
- Estimate densities of ion fields.

== Specifications ==
- Given a deep space network (DSN) of receivers and/or transmitters.
- A Ka-band traveling wave tube amplifier (K-TWTA) amplifies signals to a transmitting antenna to be received by a distal radio telescope.
- Ka-band translator (KAT) receives signal from a high gain antenna and retransmits the signal back to DSN. In this way the phase and phase-shift resulting from signal modification
- Ka-band exciter (KEX) it supplies telemetry data.
- S-band transmitter is used for radio science experiments. The transmitter receives signal from the RFS, amplifies and multiplies the signal, sending a 2290 MHz signal to the antenna.
- Filter microwave emitter allow only microwaves of a given frequency to be emitted, there is a polarizing element. There are two-bypass filters and a wave-guide. The bypass filters allow different feed polarizations, receiving and transmitting.
