= Journal of Research of the National Institute of Standards and Technology =

Academic journal

- Discipline: Engineering
- Language: English

Publication details
- Former names: Journal of Research of the National Bureau of Standards; Bureau of Standards Journal of Research; Scientific Papers of the Bureau of Standards; Technologic Papers of the Bureau of Standards
- History: 1904–2021
- Frequency: Bimonthly
- Impact factor: 1.34 (2016)

Standard abbreviations
- ISO 4: J. Res. Natl. Inst. Stand. Technol.

Indexing
- CODEN: JRITEF
- ISSN: 1044-677X (print); 2165-7254 (web)
- OCLC no.: 19017279

Links
- Journal homepage

The Journal of Research of the National Institute of Standards and Technology was the flagship peer-reviewed scientific journal of the National Institute of Standards and Technology. It was published from 1904–2022. Its former name was Journal of Research of the National Bureau of Standards. Its section D (Radio Science, 1964–1965; Radio Propagation, 1959–1963) was continued as the Radio Science journal. The final editor-in-chief was Ron B. Goldfarb. Volume 126 was the last issue.
