= International Union of Radio Science =

International scientific organization

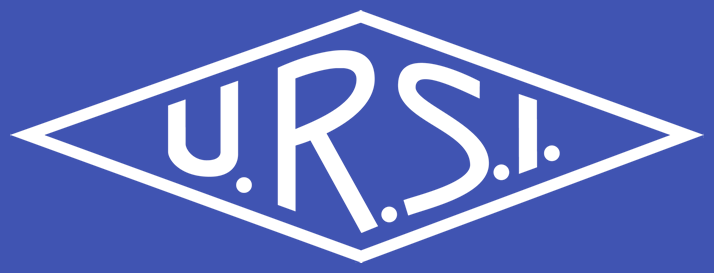
- Abbreviation: URSI
- Formation: 1919; 107 years ago
- Type: INGO
- Region served: Worldwide
- Official language: English, French
- President: Ari Sihvola
- Parent organization: International Council for Science
- Website: www.ursi.org

The International Union of Radio Science (abbreviated URSI, after its French name, Union radio-scientifique internationale) is one of 26 international scientific unions affiliated to the International Council for Science (ICSU), devoted to radio science.

== History and objectives ==
URSI was officially created in 1919, during the Constitutive Assembly of the International Research Council (now ICSU), based on the earlier French: Commission Internationale de Telegraphie sans Fil (1913–1914) when the only radio communication system was radiotelegraphy. It has held a general assembly every three years from 1922. Fifty years ago URSI was one of the most important promoters of the International Geophysical Year.

In addition to publishing the open access journal URSI Radio Science Letters, it sponsors the journals Advances in Radio Science, Journal of Atmospheric and Solar-Terrestrial Physics, and Radio Science, last of which is co-sponsored by the American Geophysical Union.

URSI's original objective (to encourage "scientific studies of radiotelegraphy, especially those which require international cooperation") has been broadened to include all radio science, from telecommunications to radio astronomy, acquisition of radar information about distant passive objects, studies of the radiation stimulated or spontaneously emitted by these objects, biological effects of electromagnetic radiation and active modification of objects by radio waves, within the spectrum from extremely low frequency to the optical domain.

== Commissions ==
- Commission A: Electromagnetic Metrology
- Commission B: Fields and Waves
- Commission C: Radiocommunication Systems and Signal Processing
- Commission D: Electronics and Photonics
- Commission E: Electromagnetic Environment and Interference
- Commission F: Wave Propagation and Remote Sensing
- Commission G: Ionospheric Radio and Propagation
- Commission H: Waves in Plasmas
- Commission J: Radio Astronomy
- Commission K: Electromagnetics in Biology and Medicine

A few Commissions are engaged with international projects in cooperation with other international bodies, for example with the Committee on Space Research in the project International Reference Ionosphere.

== Individual membership ==
The URSI includes different individual membership grades:

- Corresponding member (CURSI)
- Senior member, awarded to members who have a PhD, 10+ publications, and a history of involvement with the URSI
- Fellow, by invitation or by winning a URSI senior prize

== See also ==
- Outline of radio science
