= Transposed excitation =

In electrical engineering, transposed excitation of a dipole array means that adjacent dipoles in the array are excited in opposite directions.

Dipole arrays with transposed excitation are used as antennas; they are closely related to self-complementary antenna.
