= Remote sensing atmospheric boundary layer =

Ground-based, flight-based, or satellite-based remote sensing instruments can be used to measure properties of the planetary boundary layer, including boundary layer height, aerosols and clouds. Satellite remote sensing of the atmosphere has the advantage of being able to provide global coverage of atmospheric planetary boundary layer properties while simultaneously providing relatively high temporal sampling rates. Advancements in satellite remote sensing have provided greater vertical resolution which enables higher accuracy for planetary boundary layer measurements.

The radiative forcing for marine boundary layer (MBL) clouds is imperative for understanding any global warming changes. Low-level clouds, including MBL clouds, have the largest net radiative forcing of all clouds. The albedo of these low level clouds is much higher than the albedo of the underlying ocean surface and correctly modeling these clouds is needed to limit the uncertainty in climate model predictions. The remote sensing of the planetary boundary layer, especially clouds and aerosols within the planetary boundary layer can help verify and improve climate models.

== Planetary boundary layer ==
The planetary boundary layer is the portion of the troposphere that is influenced by the interaction with the surface of the earth and will adjust to surface forcings within a timescale of 1 hour. The planetary boundary layer is characterized by turbulence during the daytime and by stability during the night. At the top of the planetary boundary layer, there is a stable layer that is frequently termed the inversion layer as temperature tends to increase with height in contrast to much of the troposphere. The planetary boundary layer can have lower level clouds located around the capping inversion top. The two main types of clouds within the planetary boundary layer are fair-weather cumulus clouds and stratocumulus clouds. The underlying surface primarily determines the type of cloud produced within the planetary boundary layer. The presence of the capping inversion can also trap aerosols within the planetary boundary layer. The increase of anthropogenic aerosols from burning fossil fuels can have significant impacts on precipitation and climate.

== Satellite Remote Sensing ==
Satellite measurements have the advantage of being able to sample meteorological variables in regions that have little measurement systems. Many instruments have been created to help observe the atmosphere for both research and weather prediction. One of the first successful satellite missions for weather radar observations was the Television Infrared Observation Satellite (TIROS). This instrument paved the way for more weather satellite systems that utilize the visible, infrared and microwave radiation spectrum. Current remote sensing instruments that can help detect planetary boundary layer phenomenon include the Moderate-Resolution Imaging Spectroradiometer (MODIS) aboard Terra and Aqua as well as CALIOP (Cloud-Aerosol Lidar with Orthogonal Polarization) aboard CALIPSO. While MODIS and many other satellites are passive remote sensors, active remote sensors such as CALIPSO provide greater accuracy for height retrievals. Satellite measurements have been used to determine the dynamical conditions that produce planetary boundary layer clouds and the climatological regions of where these clouds occur.

== Planetary boundary layer clouds ==
=== Remote sensing of mesoscale cellular convection ===
Mesoscale cellular convection (MCC) is a form of buoyantly driven convection that can provide the planetary boundary layer with cumulus clouds at the top of the boundary layer. MCC generally occurs over ocean regions and is primarily found off the coasts of major continents particularly in North and South America. MCC is a form of the Bénard cell where the fluid will rise or fall in hexagonal cells creating hexagonal cloud structure. The capping inversion of the planetary boundary layer acts as a lid for the convection creating a horizontal plane for the hexagonal cloud structures. Satellite observations have been imperative for understanding the horizontal scale and the vertical scale of these cloud formations. MCC is generally too small for synoptic scale measurements, but too large for single point measurements. However, satellite observations are able to monitor the development of the cloud patterns because of their large field of view. Satellites images from TIROS helped to highlight one of the main differences between laboratory convection cells and those that occur in the atmosphere. The ratio of the diameter of the hexagon compared to the depth of the cloud was much larger in the atmosphere compared to the same ratio calculated in controlled experiments. This difference showed that viscosity and heat conduction were important for the laboratory measurements, but eddy diffusion of heat and momentum dominated the atmospheric cells. Wind shear must be low to form MCC cells otherwise cloud streaks will form in the direction of the wind shear. The cloud formations that occur as part of MCC can be placed into two categories: open cells and closed cells.

=== Open cells ===
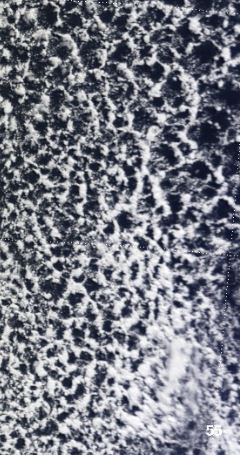
MODIS image of open cellular convection taken southeast of South Africa

Open cells are characterized by a cloud free region in the middle of the hexagonal formation with cloudy regions in the outer edge of the hexagon. The open cell will have slow descending motion in the middle with faster rising motion on the edges forming the hexagonal cloud shape. They tend to form over colder water such as those that exist off the Californian coast.

While places such as the Californian coast regularly produce open cellular convection, atmospheric storm systems can also spur the production of open cellular clouds in regions of low climatological production. Open cellular patterns can often be found behind cold fronts in the cold unstable air, and produce multiple cloud types including cumulus congenstus, cumulonimbus, and stratocumulus clouds. However, the open cells formed in subtropical regions are not normally associated with synoptic storms.

=== Closed cells ===
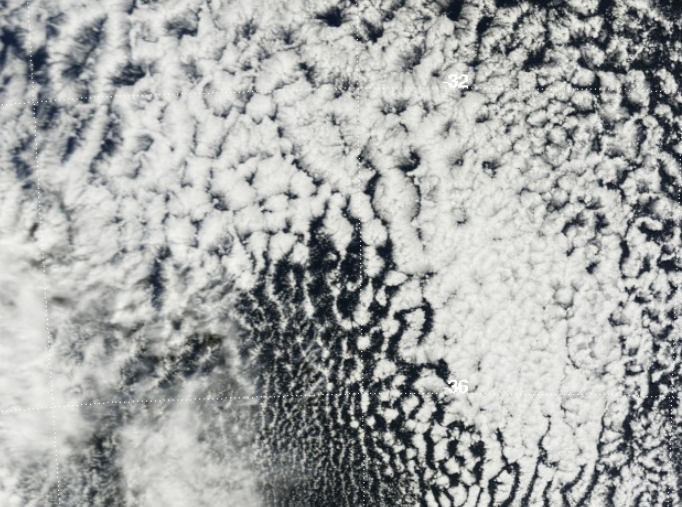
MODIS image of closed cellular convection taken southeast of South Africa

Closed cells contain cloud filled regions in the center of the hexagon formation with cloud free regions on the edge of the hexagon. The closed cell has slow rising motion in the middle and faster descending motion at the edges. Closed cells tend to occur over warmer waters such as those associated with the Kuroshio Current and the Gulf Stream.

Closed cellular patterns are generally formed under weak convective mixing in the lower levels with an inversion layer cap. They commonly occur in the eastern sections of subtropical high pressure regions or in the southeastern quadrant of polar highs.

== Aerosols from Satellites ==
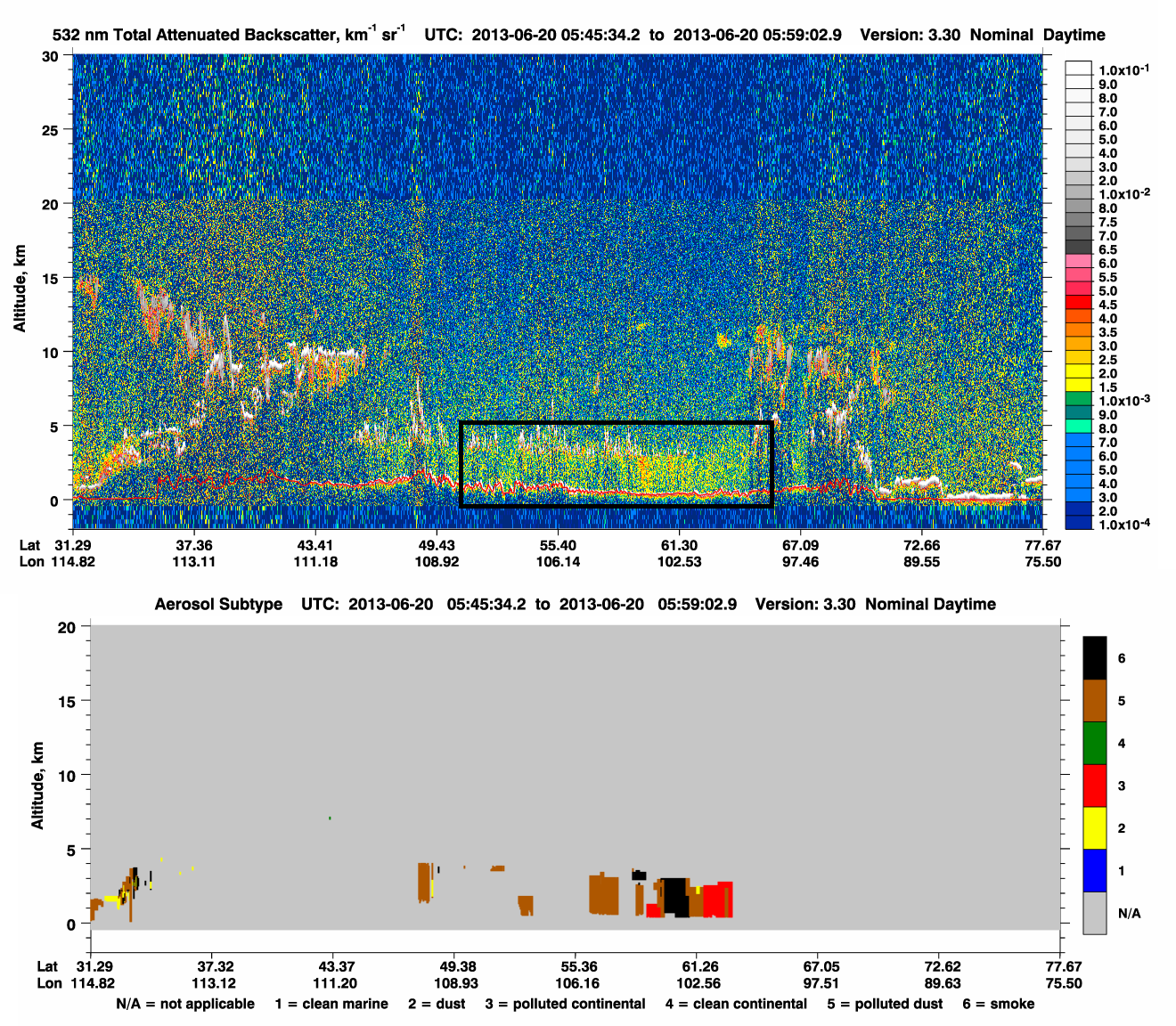
CALIPSO satellite image showing lidar backscatter and aerosol classification based on the backscatter data.

The CALIOP on board CALIPSO allows for the measurements of different aerosol particles by measuring the backscatter at wavelengths of 1064 and 532 nanometers with the ability to receive two orthogonal components in the 532 nm wavelength. Without the presence of optically thick clouds, aerosol layers within the planetary boundary layer may be measured and provides a great technique for measuring aerosol pollution. Ground-based lidar have shown agreement with CALIOP in measuring isolated aerosol layers above the Seoul metropolitan area.

CALIPSO has also been used in conjunction with the MODIS data to determine how aerosols within the planetary boundary layer might alter low planetary boundary layer stratus clouds. The detection of biomass burning aerosols were shown to decrease the cloud droplet radius within these warm layer clouds in agreement with the Albrecht effect, while simultaneously decreasing liquid water path in contrast to the Albrecht effect.

== Boundary layer height ==
The boundary layer tends to have higher moisture values and greater aerosol amounts which results in higher scattering of light within the boundary layer. With remote sensing instruments, the boundary layer height can be detected based on these principles. Using the lidar on board CALIPSO, boundary layer height estimates have been made and compared with radiosonde and ECMWF re-analysis data and have shown high correlations between the remote sensing estimated value and the measured radiosonde values.

The boundary layer height can be derived in a few different ways from lidar data including the maximum variance technique, which states that the maximum in the variance of the backscatter occurs at the top of the boundary layer. Within the entrainment zone, cleaner free troposphere eddies will mix with more polluted boundary layer eddies resulting in high variances at the height of the entrainment layer. The use of satellite derived boundary layer heights provides another method for verifying climate model output. Some remote sensing instruments have limitations. Since CALIOP relies on the use of backscattered light, daytime retrievals can contain high signal to noise ratios as sunlight can add background noise. Nighttime retrievals

== Boundary layer composition ==
Under suitable conditions, specialized lidar techniques can be used to determine the boundary layer composition. Lidar pulses used for remote sensing get pulse echoes off the ground and off clouds. When there is a layer of broken clouds at the top of the boundary layer, IPDA lidar techniques used for atmospheric composition remote sensing can obtain the boundary layer composition.
