= Outline of radio science =

Overview of and topical guide to radio science

One way of outlining the subject of radio science is listing the topics associated with it by authoritative bodies.

== Union of Radio Science International (URSI) ==
The International Union of Radio Science has several commissions corresponding to the following topics of interest:

- Commission A – Electromagnetic metrology
  - Antennas
  - Atomic-based mechatronics
  - Bioeffects and medical applications
  - Electromagnetic compatibility (EMC) and EM metrology
  - High-frequency and millimeter Wireless metrology
  - Impulse radar
  - Interconnect and packaging
  - Materials
  - Measurements and calibration in propagation
  - Microwave to sub-millimeter measurements/standards
  - Noise
  - Quantum metrology and fundamental concepts
  - Space plasma characterization
  - Techniques for remote sensing
  - Test facilities
  - Tetrahertz (THz) metrology
  - Time and frequency
  - Time-domain metrology
- Commission B – Fields and waves
  - Antenna arrays
  - Antennas: recent advances and future outlook
  - Antenna theory
  - design and measurements
  - Cognitive radio
  - Complex media
    - bandgap structures
    - biological
    - geophysical media
    - metamaterials
    - and others
  - Educational methods and tools
  - Electromagnetic interaction and coupling
  - Guided waves and waveguiding structures
  - High-frequency techniques
  - Imaging
  - inverse scattering and remote sensing
  - Mathematical modeling of electromagnetic problems
  - Microstrip antennas and printed devices
  - Multiphysics electromagnetics
  - Nanoscale electromagnetics
  - Nonlinear electromagnetics
  - Numerical methods
    - differential-and integral-equation based
    - hybrid and other techniques
  - Optical phenomena
  - Optimization techniques in electromagnetics
  - Propagation phenomena and effects
  - Rough surfaces and random media
  - Scattering and diffraction
  - Theoretical electromagnetics
  - THz antennas and propagation
  - Transient fields effects and systems
  - Ultra-wideband electromagnetics
  - Wireless communications
- Commission C – Radiocommunication systems and signal processing
  - Cognitive radio and software-defined radio
  - Distributed sensor networks and sensors array processing
  - Energy-efficient ("green") communications
  - Information theory, coding, modulation and detection
  - MIMO and MISO systems
  - Novel radio communication systems
  - Physics-based signal processing
  - Radar target detection, localization, and tracking
  - Radio localization and positioning
  - Signal and image processing
  - Spectrum and medium utilization
  - Statistical signal processing of waves in random media
  - Synthetic aperture and space-time processing
  - Wireless networking
- Commission D – Electronics and photonics
  - Broadband ubiquitous network
  - Energy harvesting in wireless systems
  - Fiber lasers and solid state lasers
  - Graphene nanoelectronics applications
  - Multi-physics modelling in radio frequency nanoelectronics
  - Optical sensors and biosensors
  - Plasmonics
  - RF MEMS and NEMS
  - Signal processing antennas
  - 60 GHz electronics
  - Trends in RFID for identification and sensing
  - Trends in THz communications
- Commission E – Electromagnetic environment and interference
  - Communication in the presence of noise
  - Crosstalk
  - Electromagnetic compatibility education
  - Electromagnetic compatibility measurements and standards
  - Electromagnetic noise of natural origin
  - Electromagnetic radiation hazards
  - High-power effects of transients on electronic systems
  - Spectrum management and utilization
- Commission F – Wave propagation and remote sensing
  - Propagation measurements/models for fixed and mobile links
  - Measurements of fixed and mobile channels
  - Propagation models
  - Multipath mitigation
  - Fixed terrestrial links: measurements and design strategies
  - Surface/atmosphere interaction
  - Dispersion/delay
  - Effects of natural/man-made structures
  - Outdoor to indoor propagation
  - Multi link MIMO channels
  - UWB channel characteristics, Small cell propagation
  - Remote sensing of the Earth/planets by radio waves
  - Passive sensing at millimeter wavelengths
  - Interferometry and SAR
  - Sensing of snow in open and forested environments
  - Remote sensing of precipitation
  - Atmospheric sensing
  - Sensing of soil moisture and biomass
  - Ocean and ice sensing
  - Urban environments
  - Radio Frequency Interference (RFI)
  - Underground imaging
  - Propagation and remote sensing in complex and random media
- Commission G – Ionospheric radio and propagation
  - Ionospheric imaging
  - Ionospheric morphology
  - Ionospheric modeling and data assimilation
  - Radar and radio techniques for ionospheric diagnostics
  - Space weather – radio effects
  - Transionospheric radio propagation and systems effects
- Commission H – Waves in plasma
  - Chaos and turbulence in plasma
  - Plasma instabilities and wave propagation
  - Spacecraft-plasma interactions
  - Solar/planetary plasma interactions
  - Wave-wave and wave-particle interactions
  - Waves in laboratory plasmas
- Commission J – Radio astronomy
  - Detection of short-duration transients
  - Developments in array technology for radio astronomy
  - New telescopes, techniques, and observations
  - Radio frequency interference mitigation and spectrum usage
  - Square Kilometre Array
  - Timely technical tutorials
- Commission K – Electromagnetics in biology and medicine
  - Biological effects
  - Dosimetry and exposure assessment
  - Electromagnetic imaging and sensing applications
  - Human body interactions with antennas and other electromagnetic devices
  - Therapeutic, rehabilitative, and other biomedical applications

== International Telecommunication Union (ITU-R) ==
The International Telecommunication Union (ITU) Radiocommunication Sector (ITU-R) has several study groups, each made of working parties, as follows:

- Study Group 1 – Spectrum management
  - 1A: Spectrum engineering techniques
  - 1B: Spectrum management methodologies and economic strategies
  - 1C: Spectrum monitoring
- Study Group 3 – Radiowave propagation
  - 3J: Propagation fundamentals
  - 3K: Point-to-area propagation
  - 3L: Ionospheric propagation and radio noise
  - 3M: Point-to-point and Earth-space propagation
- Study Group 4 – Satellite services
  - 4A: Efficient orbit/spectrum utilization for the fixed-satellite service (FSS) and broadcasting-satellite service (BSS)
  - 4B: Systems, air interfaces, performance and availability objectives for the fixed-satellite service (FSS), broadcasting-satellite service (BSS) and mobile-satellite service (MSS), including IP-based applications and satellite news gathering (SNG)
  - 4C: Efficient orbit/spectrum utilization for the mobile-satellite service (MSS) and the radiodetermination-satellite service (RDSS)
- Study Group 5 – Terrestrial services
  - 5A: Land mobile service above 30 MHz (excluding IMT); wireless access in the fixed service; amateur and amateur-satellite services
  - 5B: Maritime mobile service including the Global Maritime Distress and Safety System (GMDSS); the aeronautical mobile service and the radiodetermination service
  - 5C: Fixed wireless systems; HF and other systems below 30 MHz in the fixed and land mobile services
  - 5D: IMT systems (International Mobile Telecommunications)
- Study Group 6 – Broadcasting service
  - 6A: Terrestrial broadcasting delivery
  - 6B: Broadcast service assembly and access
  - 6C: Programme production and quality assessment
- Study Group 7 – Science services
  - 7A: Time signals and frequency standard emissions: Systems and applications (terrestrial and satellite) for dissemination of standard time and frequency signals
  - 7B: Space radiocommunication applications: Systems for transmission/reception of telecommunicated and tele-metry data
  - 7C: Remote sensing systems: for space operation and for space research
  - 7D: Radio astronomy: remote sensing systems and applications for Earth exploration meteorology and planetary sensing.

== See also ==
- Radio physics
- Radio science subsystem
