= Very high frequency =

Electromagnetic wave range of 30–300 MHz

- Frequency range: 30 MHz to 300 MHz
- Wavelength range: 10 to 1 m

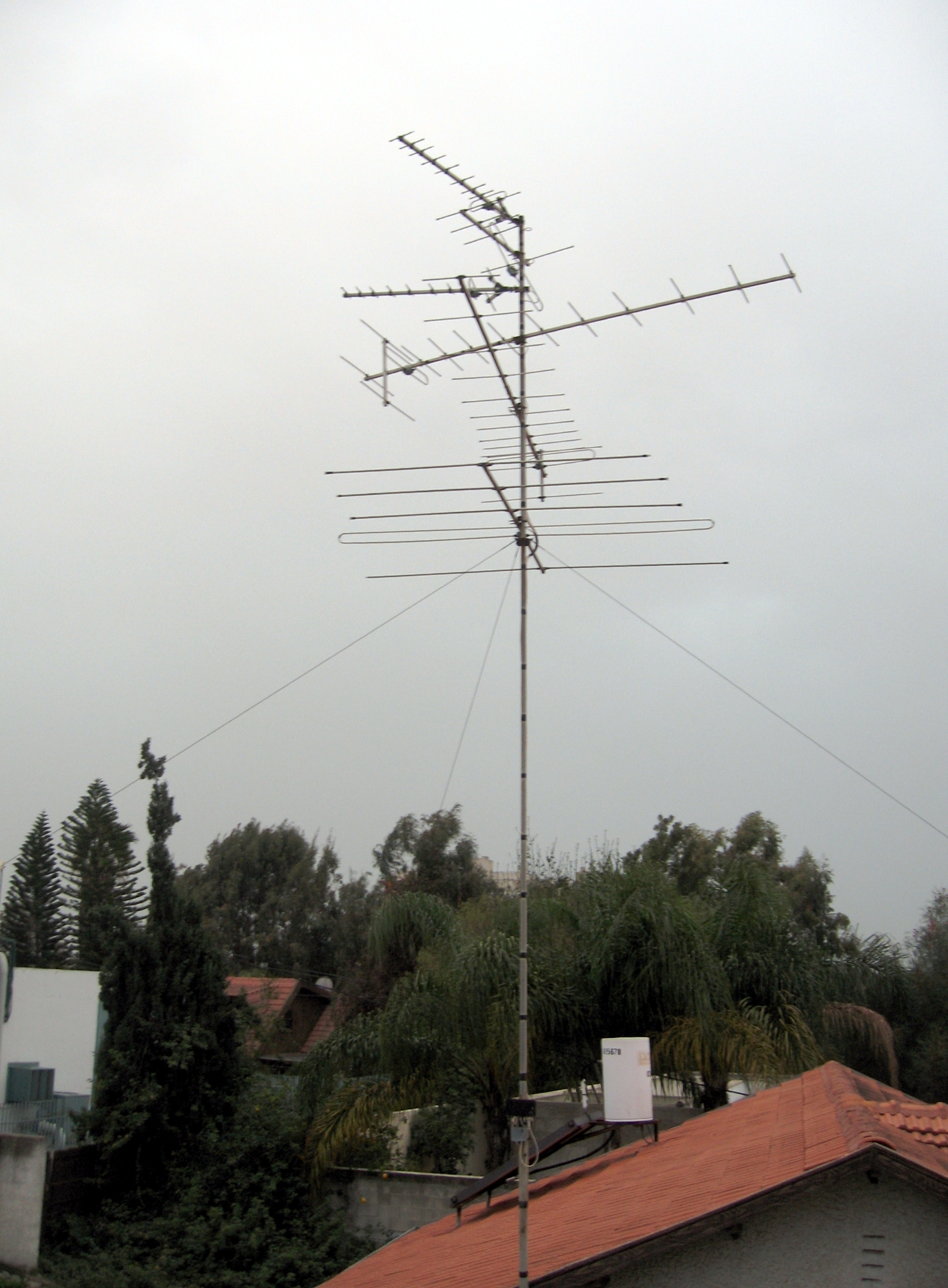
VHF television antennas used for broadcast television reception. These six antennas are a type known as a Yagi antenna, which is widely used on VHF.

Very high frequency (VHF) is the ITU designation for the range of radio frequency electromagnetic waves (radio waves) from 30 to 300 megahertz (MHz), with corresponding wavelengths of ten meters to one meter. Frequencies immediately below VHF are denoted high frequency (HF), and the next higher frequencies are known as ultra high frequency (UHF).

VHF radio waves propagate mainly by line-of-sight, so they are blocked by hills and mountains, although due to refraction they can travel somewhat beyond the visual horizon out to about 160 km (100 miles). Common uses for radio waves in the VHF band are Digital Audio Broadcasting (DAB) and FM radio broadcasting, television broadcasting, two-way land mobile radio systems (emergency, business, private use and military), long range data communication up to several tens of kilometers with radio modems, amateur radio, and marine communications. Air traffic control communications and air navigation systems (e.g. VOR and ILS) work at distances of 100 kilometres (62 miles) or more to aircraft at cruising altitude.

In the Americas and many other parts of the world, VHF Band I was used for the transmission of analog television. As part of the worldwide transition to digital terrestrial television most countries require broadcasters to air television in the VHF range using digital, rather than analog encoding.

== Propagation characteristics ==
Radio waves in the VHF band propagate mainly by line-of-sight and ground-bounce paths; unlike in the HF band there is only some reflection at lower frequencies from the ionosphere (skywave propagation). They do not follow the contour of the Earth as ground waves and so are blocked by hills and mountains, although because they are weakly refracted (bent) by the atmosphere they can travel somewhat beyond the visual horizon out to about 160 km (100 miles). They can penetrate building walls and be received indoors, although in urban areas reflections from buildings cause multipath propagation, which can interfere with television reception. Atmospheric radio noise and interference (RFI) from electrical equipment is less of a problem in this and higher frequency bands than at lower frequencies. The VHF band is the first band at which efficient transmitting antennas are small enough that they can be mounted on vehicles and portable devices, so the band is used for two-way land mobile radio systems, such as walkie-talkies, and two way radio communication with aircraft (Airband) and ships (marine radio). Occasionally, when conditions are right, VHF waves can travel long distances by tropospheric ducting due to refraction by temperature gradients in the atmosphere.

== Line-of-sight calculation ==
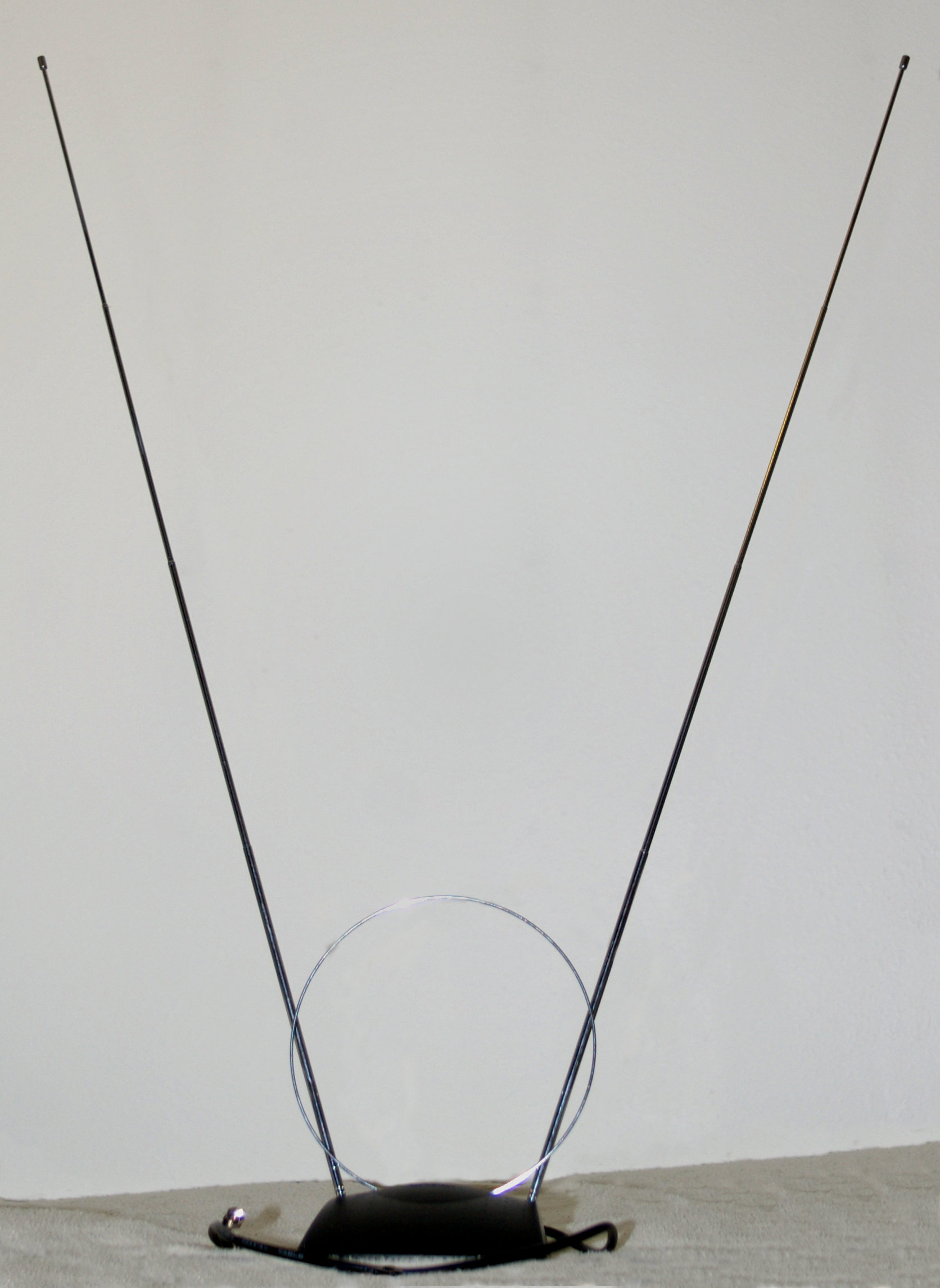
"Rabbit-ears" VHF television antenna (the small loop is a separate UHF antenna)

VHF transmission range is a function of transmitter power, receiver sensitivity, and distance to the horizon, since VHF signals propagate under normal conditions as a near line-of-sight phenomenon. The distance to the radio horizon is slightly extended over the geometric line of sight to the horizon, as radio waves are weakly bent back toward the Earth by the atmosphere.

An approximation to calculate the line-of-sight horizon distance (on Earth) is:

- distance in nautical miles = $1.23\times\sqrt{ A_\textrm{ft}}$ where $A_\textrm{ft}$ is the height of the antenna in feet
- distance in kilometers = $\sqrt{12.746 \times A_\textrm{m}}$ where $A_\textrm{m}$ is the height of the antenna in meters.

These approximations are only valid for antennas at heights that are small compared to the radius of the Earth. They may not necessarily be accurate in mountainous areas, since the landscape may not be transparent enough for radio waves.

In engineered communications systems, more complex calculations are required to assess the probable coverage area of a proposed transmitter station.

== Antennas ==
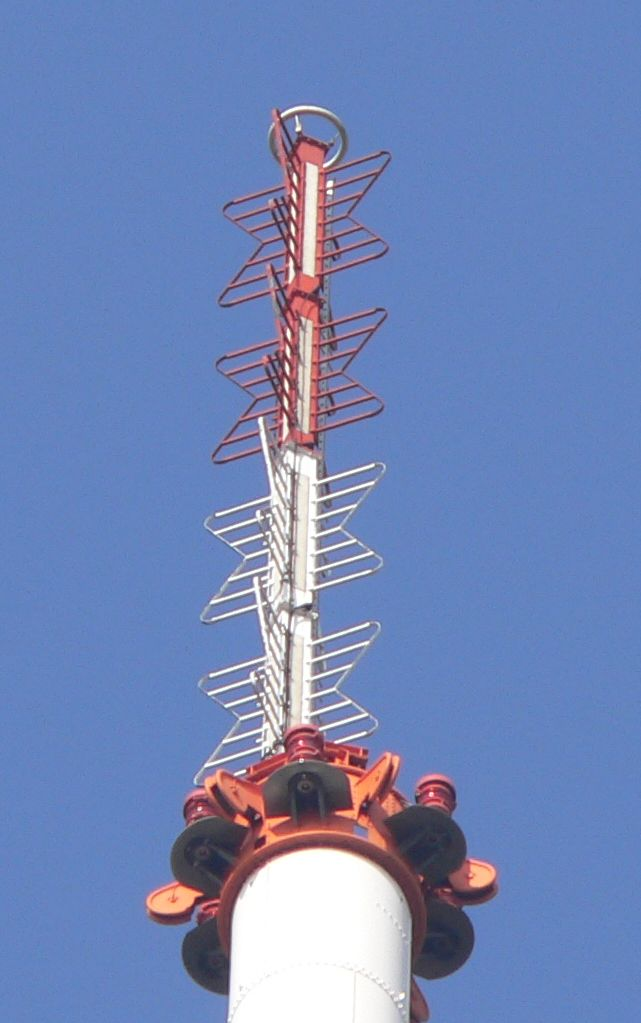
A VHF television broadcasting antenna. This is a common type called a super turnstile or batwing antenna.

VHF is the first band at which wavelengths are small enough that efficient transmitting antennas are short enough to mount on vehicles and handheld devices, a quarter wave whip antenna at VHF frequencies is 25 cm to 2.5 meter (10 inches to 8 feet) long. So the VHF and UHF wavelengths are used for two-way radios in vehicles, aircraft, and handheld transceivers and walkie-talkies. Portable radios usually use whips or rubber ducky antennas, while base stations usually use larger fiberglass whips or collinear arrays of vertical dipoles.

For directional antennas, the Yagi antenna is the most widely used as a high gain or "beam" antenna. For television reception, the Yagi is used, as well as the log-periodic antenna due to its wider bandwidth. Helical and turnstile antennas are used for satellite communication since they employ circular polarization. For even higher gain, multiple Yagis or helicals can be mounted together to make array antennas. Vertical collinear arrays of dipoles can be used to make high gain omnidirectional antennas, in which more of the antenna's power is radiated in horizontal directions. Television and FM broadcasting stations use collinear arrays of specialized dipole antennas such as batwing antennas.

== Universal use ==
Certain subparts of the VHF band have the same use around the world. Some national uses are detailed below.

- 50–54 MHz: amateur radio 6-meter band.
- 108–118 MHz: Air navigation beacons VOR and Instrument Landing System localizer.
- 118–137 MHz: Airband for air traffic control, AM, 121.5 MHz is emergency frequency
- 144–146 MHz: amateur radio 2-meter band (Extends up to 148 MHz in some Regions).
- 156–174 MHz: VHF maritime mobile band for maritime two-way radio on ships.

== By country ==
A plan showing VHF use in television, FM radio, amateur radio, marine radio and aviation.

=== Australia ===
The VHF TV band in Australia was originally allocated channels 1 to 10-with channels 2, 7 and 9 assigned for the initial services in Sydney and Melbourne, and later the same channels were assigned in Brisbane, Adelaide and Perth. Other capital cities and regional areas used a combination of these and other frequencies as available. The initial commercial services in Hobart and Darwin were respectively allocated channels 6 and 8 rather than 7 or 9.

By the early 1960s it became apparent that the 10 VHF channels were insufficient to support the growth of television services. This was rectified by the addition of three additional frequencies-channels 0, 5A and 11. Older television sets using rotary dial tuners required adjustment to receive these new channels. Most TVs of that era were not equipped to receive these broadcasts, and so were modified at the owners' expense to be able to tune into these bands; otherwise the owner had to buy a new TV.

Several TV stations were allocated to VHF channels 3, 4 and 5, which were within the FM radio bands although not yet used for that purpose. A couple of notable examples were NBN-3 Newcastle, WIN-4 Wollongong and ABC Newcastle on channel 5. While some Channel 5 stations were moved to 5A in the 1970s and 80s, beginning in the 1990s, the Australian Broadcasting Authority began a process to move these stations to UHF bands to free up valuable VHF spectrum for its original purpose of FM radio. In addition, by 1985 the federal government decided new TV stations are to be broadcast on the UHF band.

Two new VHF channels, 9A and 12, have since been made available and are being used primarily for digital services (e.g. ABC in capital cities) but also for some new analogue services in regional areas. Because channel 9A is not used for television services in or near Sydney, Melbourne, Brisbane, Adelaide or Perth, digital radio in those cities are broadcast on DAB frequencies blocks 9A, 9B and 9C.

VHF radio is also used for marine Radio as per its long-distance reachability comparing UHF frequencies.

Example allocation of VHF–UHF frequencies:

- Radionavigation 60: 84–86 MHz
- Fixed Maritime Mobile: 130–135.7 MHz
- Fixed Aeronautical radio navigation: 160–190 MHz
- Broadcasting Aeronautical Radionavigation: 255–283.5 MHz
- Aeronautical Radionavigation AUS 49 / Maritime Radionavigation (radiobeacons) 73: 315–325 MHz

=== New Zealand ===
- 44–51, 54–68 MHz: Band I Television (channels 1–3)
- 87.5–108 MHz: Band II Radio
- 118–137 MHz: Airband for air traffic control, AM
  - 108–117.975 MHz: Air navigation beacons VOR and ILS
  - 121.5 MHz is an emergency frequency
- 144–148 MHz: Amateur radio 2-meter band
- 156–162.2 MHz: Marine radio
- 174–230 MHz: Band III Television (channels 4–11)

Until 2013, the four main free-to-air TV stations in New Zealand used the VHF television bands (Band I and Band III) to transmit to New Zealand households. Other stations, including a variety of pay and regional free-to-air stations, were forced to broadcast in the UHF band, since the VHF band had been very overloaded with four stations sharing a very small frequency band, which was so overcrowded that one or more channels would not be available in some smaller towns.

However, at the end of 2013, all television channels stopped broadcasting on the VHF bands, as New Zealand moved to digital television broadcasting, requiring all stations to either broadcast on UHF or satellite (where UHF was unavailable) utilising the Freeview service.

Refer to Australasian television frequencies for more information.

=== United Kingdom ===
British television originally used VHF band I and band III. Television on VHF was in black and white with 405-line format (although there were experiments with all three colour systems-NTSC, PAL, and SECAM-adapted for the 405-line system in the late 1950s and early 1960s).

British colour television was broadcast on UHF (channels 21–69), beginning in the late 1960s. From then on, TV was broadcast on both VHF and UHF (VHF being a monochromatic downconversion from the 625-line colour signal), with the exception of BBC2 (which had always broadcast solely on UHF). The last British VHF TV transmitters closed down on January 3, 1985. VHF band III is now used in the UK for digital audio broadcasting, and VHF band II is used for FM radio, as it is in most of the world.

Unusually, the UK has an amateur radio allocation at 4 metres, 70–70.5 MHz.

=== United States and Canada ===
Frequency assignments between US and Canadian users are closely coordinated since much of the Canadian population is within VHF radio range of the US border. Certain discrete frequencies are reserved for radio astronomy. The general services in the VHF band are:

- 30–49.6 MHz: Licensed 2-way land mobile communication, with various sub-bands. (Note: The 42 MHz Segment is still in current use by the California Highway Patrol, New Jersey State Police, Tennessee Highway Patrol, and other state law enforcement agencies.)
- 30–88 MHz: Military VHF FM, including SINCGARS
- 43–50 MHz: Cordless telephones, 49 MHz FM walkie-talkies and radio controlled toys, and mixed 2-way mobile communication. The FM broadcast band originally operated here (42–50 MHz) before it was moved to 88–108 MHz.
- 50–54 MHz: Amateur radio 6-meter band
  - 50.8–51 MHz: Radio-controlled aircraft (on ten fixed frequencies at 20 kHz spacing) with an FCC amateur radio Service license, flown under FCC Part 97, rule 97.215.
- 54–88 MHz, known as "Band I" internationally; some DTV stations will appear here. See Pan-American television frequencies.
  - 54–72 MHz TV channels 2–4 (VHF-Lo)
  - 72–76 MHz: Radio controlled models, industrial remote control, and other devices. Model aircraft operate on 72 MHz while surface models operate on 75 MHz in the US and Canada, air navigation beacons 74.8–75.2 MHz.
  - 76–88 MHz TV channels 5–6 (VHF-Lo)
- 87.5–108 MHz: FM radio broadcasting (87.9–91.9 non-commercial, 92–108 commercial in the United States) (known as "Band II" internationally)
- 108–118 MHz: Air navigation beacons VOR
- 118–137 MHz: Airband for air traffic control, AM
  - 121.5 MHz is an emergency frequency
- 137–138 MHz Space research, space operations, meteorological satellite
- 138–144 MHz: Land mobile, auxiliary civil services, satellite, space research, and other miscellaneous services
- 144–148 MHz: Amateur radio 2-meter band
- 148–150 MHz: Land mobile, fixed, satellite
- 150–156 MHz: "VHF business band", public safety, the unlicensed Multi-Use Radio Service (MURS), and other 2-way land mobile, FM
- 156–158 MHz VHF Marine Radio
  - 156.8 MHz (Channel 16) is the maritime emergency and contact frequency.
- 159.81-161.565 MHz railways (Note: The 160 and 161 areas are Association of American Railroads (AAR) 91–channel railroad radios, issued to the railroad. For example, AAR 21 is 160.425 MHz and that is issued to Tennessee Valley Railroad Museum, as well as other railroads that want AAR Channel 21.)
  - 159.81–160.2 are railroads in Canada only and are used by trucking companies in the U.S.
- 160.6–162 Wireless microphones and TV/FM broadcast remote pickup
- 162.4–162.55: NOAA Weather Stations, narrowband FM, Weatheradio Canada Stations
- 174–240 MHz, known as "Band III" internationally. A number of DTV channels have begun broadcasting here, especially many of the stations which were assigned to these channels for previous analog operation.
  - 174–216 MHz television channels 7–13 (VHF-Hi)
  - 174–216 MHz: professional wireless microphones (low power, certain exact frequencies only)
  - 216–222 MHz: land mobile, fixed, maritime mobile,
  - 222–225 MHz: 1.25 meters (US) (Canada 219–220, 222–225 MHz) amateur radio
- 225 MHz and above (UHF): Military aircraft radio, 243 MHz is an emergency frequency (225–400 MHz) AM, including HAVE QUICK, dGPS RTCM-104

Cable television, though not transmitted aerially, uses a spectrum of frequencies overlapping VHF.

==== VHF television ====
The U.S. FCC allocated television broadcasting to a channelized roster as early as 1938 with 19 channels. That changed three more times: in 1940 when Channel 19 was deleted and several channels changed frequencies, then in 1946 with television going from 18 channels to 13 channels, again with different frequencies, and finally in 1948 with the removal of Channel 1 (analog channels 2–13 remain as they were, even on cable television). Channels 14–19 later appeared on the UHF band, while channel 1 remains unused, except as a "virtual channel".

Historic US FCC allocation of VHF TV band
	1938–1940	1940–1946	1946–1948	since 1948
Channel	Range (MHz)	Range (MHz)	Range (MHz)	Range (MHz)
1	44–50	50–56	44–50	–
2	50–56	60–66	54–60	54–60
3	66–72	66–72	60–66	60–66
4	78–84	78–84	66–72	66–72
5	84–90	84–90	76–82	76–82
6	96–102	96–102	82–88	82–88
7	102–108	102–108	174–180	174–180
8	156–162	162–168	180–186	180–186
9	162–168	180–186	186–192	186–192
10	180–186	186–192	192–198	192–198
11	186–192	204–210	198–204	198–204
12	204–210	210–216	204–210	204–210
13	210–216	230–236	210–216	210–216
14	234–240	236–242	–	–
15	240–246	258–264	–	–
16	258–264	264–270	–	–
17	264–270	282–288	–	–
18	282–288	288–294	–	–
19	288–294	–	–	–

==== 87.5–87.9 MHz ====
87.5–87.9 MHz is a radio band which, in most of the world, is used for FM broadcasting. In North America, however, this bandwidth is allocated to VHF television channel 6 (82–88 MHz). The analog audio for TV channel 6 is broadcast at 87.75 MHz (adjustable down to 87.74). Several stations, known as Frankenstations, most notably those joining the Pulse 87 franchise, have operated on this frequency as radio stations, though they use television licenses. As a result, FM radio receivers such as those found in automobiles which are designed to tune into this frequency range could receive the audio for analog-mode programming on the local TV channel 6 while in North America. The practice largely ended with the DTV transition in 2009, although some still exist.

The FM broadcast channel at 87.9 MHz is normally off-limits for FM audio broadcasting; it is reserved for displaced class D stations which have no other frequencies in the normal 88.1–107.9 MHz subband to move to. So far, only two stations have qualified to operate on 87.9 MHz: 10–watt KSFH in Mountain View, California and 34–watt translator K200AA in Sun Valley, Nevada.

== Unlicensed operation ==
In some countries, particularly the United States and Canada, limited low-power license-free operation is available in the FM broadcast band for purposes such as micro-broadcasting and using personal FM transmitters to send output from CD or portable media players to radios without auxiliary-in jacks, though this is illegal in some other countries. This practice was legalised in the United Kingdom on 8 December 2006.

== See also ==
- TV radio
- List of oldest radio stations
- Apex (radio band)
- FM broadcast band
- Polar mesosphere summer echoes
- Television channel frequencies
- Knife-edge effect
- VHF omnidirectional range
