= Edward Yates =

American television director

Edward 'Ed' Yates
- Born: September 16, 1918; Yeadon, Pennsylvania, US
- Died: June 2, 2006 (aged 87); Fair Oaks Nursing Home in Media, Pennsylvania, US
- Occupation: Television director

Edward J. Yates (September 16, 1918 – June 2, 2006) was an American television director who was the director of the ABC television program American Bandstand from 1952 until 1969.

== Biography ==
Yates became a still photographer after graduating from high school in 1936. After serving in World War II, he became employed by Philadelphia's WFIL-TV as a boom microphone operator. He was later promoted to cameraman (important as most programming was done live and local during the early years of television) and earned a bachelor's degree in communications in 1950 from the University of Pennsylvania.

In October 1952, Yates volunteered to direct Bandstand, a new concept featuring local teens dancing to the latest hits patterned after the "950 Club" on WPEN-AM. The show debuted with Bob Horn as host and took off after Dick Clark, already a radio veteran at age 26, took over in 1956.

It was broadcast live in its early years, even after it became part of the ABC network's weekday afternoon lineup in 1957 as American Bandstand. Yates pulled records, directed the cameras, queued the commercials and communicated with Clark via a private line telephone located on his podium.

In 1964, Clark moved the show to Los Angeles, taking Yates with him.

Yates retired from American Bandstand in 1969, and moved his family to the Philadelphia suburb of West Chester.

== Later years and death ==
Yates died in 2006 at a nursing home, where he had been living for the last two months of his life.
