= KCLA (Arkansas) =

Radio station in Pine Bluff, Arkansas, United States (1947–2011)

Pine Bluff, Arkansas; United States
- Frequency: 1400 kHz
- Branding: The Fan SportsRadio 1400

Programming
- Format: Sports radio
- Affiliations: Fox Sports Radio; Westwood One; ESPN Radio

Ownership
- Owner: Community Broadcast Group Inc.; (M.R.S. Ventures, Inc.)
- Sister stations: KOTN; KPBQ-FM; KZYP

History
- First air date: 1947
- Last air date: 2007
- Call sign meaning: Classic

Technical information
- Facility ID: 33725
- Class: C
- Power: 1,000 watts (unlimited)
- Transmitter coordinates: 34°11′33.4″N 92°2′42.5″W

KCLA (1400 AM) was a radio station licensed to serve the community of Pine Bluff, Arkansas, United States. The station was most recently owned by Community Broadcast Group Inc., and the broadcast license held by M.R.S. Ventures, Inc. When it went off the air permanently in early 2007, KCLA broadcast programming from Fox Sports, Westwood One, Hog Sports Talk, and ESPN Radio in a sports radio format branded as "The Fan, SportsRadio 1400".

== Ownership ==
In April 2002, Tyler, Texas, based Community Broadcast Group Inc., through its MRS Ventures subsidiary, purchased four Pine Bluff radio stations from the Deane family's SeArk Radio and Delta Radio of Pine Bluff. Delta Radio, owned by W.M. "Buddy" and Helen Deane, sold AM station KOTN. SeArk Radio, owned by their daughter Dawn Deane, sold FM stations KPBQ-FM and KZYP plus AM station KCLA. KOTN sold for a reported for $350,000 and the other three sold for a combined $1.05 million.

Buddy Deane moved to Pine Bluff from Baltimore, where he had hosted a dance-show known as The Buddy Deane Show, in 1964. (This show was parodied as the Corny Collins Show by John Waters in the film Hairspray.) Deane retired from broadcasting in May 2003 after completing the sale of his family's radio stations and died shortly thereafter in July 2003.

In June 2006, the station's owner, Jerry D. Russell, suffered a stroke. The station was being operated by another broadcaster, Hodges Broadcasting LLC, under a local marketing agreement but that operator was unable to obtain the financing to purchase the station. With Hodges gone and Russell unable to operate the station himself, KCLA went off the air for good in early 2007. In a February 2011 letter to the FCC, the owner indicated that he was surrendering the station's broadcast license as well as the licenses for ten sister stations in similar dire circumstances. On May 2, 2011, the station's license was cancelled and the KCLA call sign assignment was deleted permanently from the FCC database.
