= KPBQ-FM =

- Pine Bluff, Arkansas; United States
- Frequency: 101.3 MHz
- Branding: Q Country 101

Programming
- Format: Country music

Ownership
- Owner: Community Broadcast Group Inc.; (M.R.S. Ventures, Inc.)
- Sister stations: KOTN; KZYP; KCLA

History
- First air date: 1992
- Last air date: 2007

Technical information
- Licensing authority: FCC
- Facility ID: 52619
- Class: C3
- ERP: 25,000 watts
- HAAT: 100 meters (330 ft)
- Transmitter coordinates: 34°3′58″N 91°57′36″W

Links
- Public license information: Public file; LMS

KPBQ-FM (101.3 FM) was an American radio station licensed to serve Pine Bluff, Arkansas, United States. The station was owned by Community Broadcast Group Inc. and licensed to M.R.S. Ventures, Inc.

The station was assigned the KPBQ-FM call letters by the Federal Communications Commission on February 14, 1989. Until it went off the air for good in early 2007, the station had most recently broadcast a country music format branded as "Q Country 101".

== Ownership ==
In April 2002, Tyler, Texas, based Community Broadcast Group Inc., through its MRS Ventures subsidiary, purchased four Pine Bluff radio stations from SeArk Radio and Delta Radio of Pine Bluff. Delta Radio, owned by W.M. "Buddy" and Helen Deane, sold AM station KOTN. SeArk Radio, owned by their daughter Dawn Deane, sold FM stations KPBQ-FM and KZYP plus AM station KCLA. KOTN sold for a reported $350,000 and the other three sold for a combined $1.05 million.

Buddy Deane bought his first radio station, KOTN, in 1960 and moved from Baltimore, Maryland, where he had hosted a dance-show known as The Buddy Deane Show, in 1964. (This show was parodied as the Corny Collins Show by John Waters in the film Hairspray.) Deane retired from broadcasting in May 2003 after completing the sale of his family's radio stations. He died in July 2003.

In June 2006, the station's owner, Jerry D. Russell, suffered a stroke. The station was being operated by another broadcaster, Hodges Broadcasting LLC, under a local marketing agreement but that operator was unable to obtain the financing to purchase the station. With Hodges gone and Russell unable to operate the station himself, KPBQ-FM went off the air for good in early 2007. In a February 2011 letter to the FCC, the owner indicated that he was surrendering the station's broadcast license as well as the licenses for ten sister stations in similar dire circumstances. On May 2, 2011, the station's license was cancelled and the KPBQ-FM call sign assignment was deleted permanently from the FCC database.
