= KZYP =

KZYP may refer to:

- KZYP (AM), a radio station (1310 AM) licensed to serve Malvern, Arkansas, United States
- KZYP (defunct), a defunct radio station (99.3 FM) formerly licensed to serve Pine Bluff, Arkansas
