= ZYP =

ZYP may refer to:

- Zyphe language, ISO 639 language code
- WZYP ("104.3 'ZYP"), a radio station broadcasting in Huntsville, Alabama
- KZYP (Pine Bluff, Arkansas), a former radio station branded Zyp 99 when it closed
- Pennsylvania Station (New York City), IATA code
