= Bob Horn (broadcaster) =

American radio/television personality (1916–1966)

- Born: Donald Loyd Horn; February 20, 1916; Pine Grove, Pennsylvania, U.S.
- Died: July 31, 1966 (aged 50); Houston, Texas, U.S.
- Resting place: Forest Park Cemetery, Houston, Texas
- Other names: Bob Adams, Bob Home
- Occupation: Radio/television personality
- Known for: original host of Bandstand, later American Bandstand

Donald Loyd "Bob" Horn (February 20, 1916 in Pine Grove, Pennsylvania – July 31, 1966 in Houston) was an American radio and television personality in Philadelphia, Pennsylvania, best known for being the original host of Bandstand (which later became American Bandstand).

According to academic records from his youth, Horn sometimes spelled his surname "Horne". In addition, he initially replaced his first name with "Robert"; after landing a disc jockey job at Houston's KILT, Horn became known as Bob Adams.

== Philadelphia ==
In the late 1940s, Horn was hired by Jack Steck, Program Manager for Philadelphia's WFIL radio station, to be a daytime announcer and late night DJ for Walter Annenberg's Triangle Publications' WFIL-AM.

After several years in Philadelphia (and a brief stint in Los Angeles), Horn hosted a popular show as a DJ on WIP called C'mon and Dance. Since Horn wanted to appear on television, WFIL was able to woo him to its station to create a daytime radio show, Bob Horn's Bandstand, and a TV version of the show. Bob Horn's Bandstand premiered on WFIL-TV (Channel 6) in late September 1952 as a replacement for a weekday movie. Originally, Bob Horn's Bandstand was mostly short musical films (the ancestors of music videos); there also were studio guests.

Horn was disenchanted with the film-based program and sought to have it changed to teens dancing along, live on camera, as popular records played, based on an idea from WPEN's 950 Club, hosted by Joe Grady and Ed Hurst. Since the film idea was going nowhere, WFIL began advertising for dancers. The Bandstand makeover debuted on October 7, 1952, with hundreds dancing on live TV. Bandstand sometimes drew over 60 percent of the daytime audience, making Horn wealthy.

On July 9, 1956, Horn, fired after a drunk driving arrest, was replaced by Dick Clark after a period of on-air tryouts from various DJs. (Horn also had been charged with statutory rape and was acquitted.) Clark had shared afternoon DJ duties with Horn on WFIL-AM (Horn had been working radio and TV simultaneously, and wasn't happy about it.) Bandstand was picked up by ABC (becoming American Bandstand) on August 5, 1957, and went on to great success with Dick Clark as host.

== Houston ==
Horn, then known as Bob Adams, was heard from 9 pm to midnight on KILT (AM), a station owned by the man who invented Top 40 radio, Gordon McLendon. Horn had worked for McLendon in the mid-1940s. McLendon knew of Horn's Philadelphia troubles and called Horn to offer him a chance to get back on radio. When he went to Houston, Horn had little money but much heart. Horn purchased the Town & Country lounge in Bellaire, a suburb of Houston. With the support of his wife Ann and son Peter, Horn was back in business. At KILT, he soon went into advertising for the station. He became the best salesperson on the staff, and Houston advertisers took great delight in hearing Bob talk of his (initially) very successful career in Philadelphia. Horn eventually started an advertising agency called Bob Adams Advertising, which also was successful. He eventually bought a small ranch in the Houston suburbs.

Horn died of a heat stroke–induced heart attack while mowing his lawn in Houston on July 31, 1966, at the age of 50. He's buried in Forest Park Cemetery in that city with the epitaph, "Bandstand".
