= Batwing antenna =

Type of broadcasting antenna

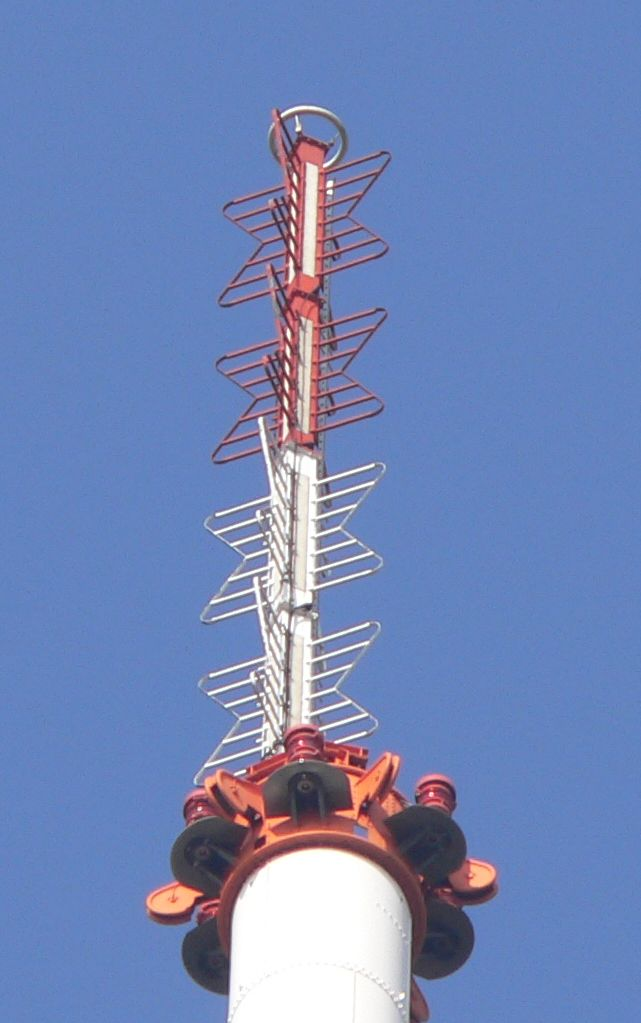
Four-bay super turnstile television broadcasting antenna at Mühlacker television transmitter, Germany

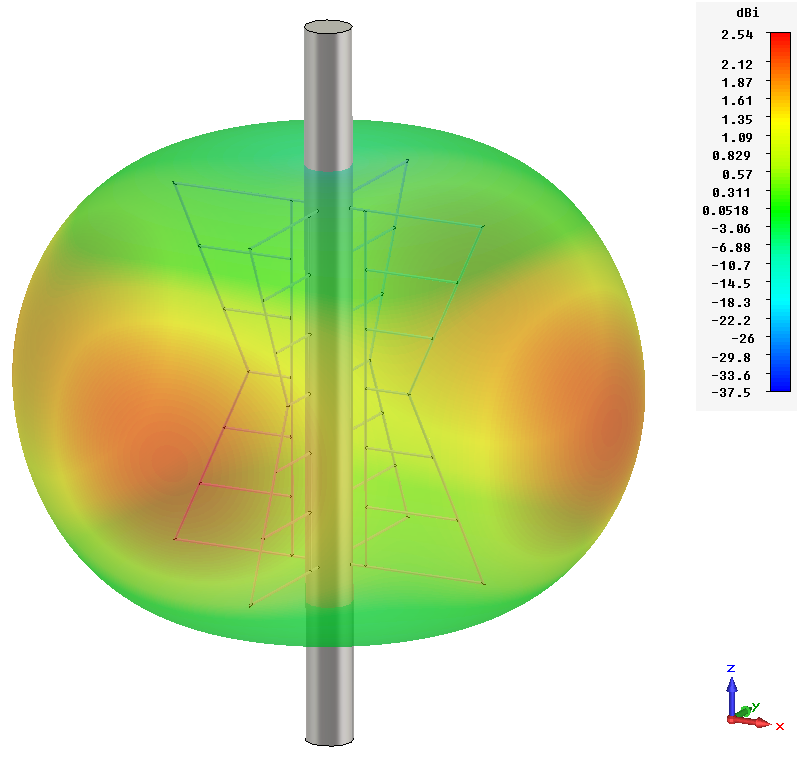
Calculated radiation pattern of a single batwing bay

A batwing or super turnstile antenna is a broadcasting antenna used at VHF and UHF frequencies, named for its distinctive shape resembling a bat wing or bow tie. Stacked arrays of batwing antennas are used as television broadcasting antennas due to their omnidirectional characteristics. Batwing antennas generate a horizontally polarized signal. The advantage of the "batwing" design for television broadcasting is that it has a wide bandwidth. It was the first widely used television broadcasting antenna.

== Design and characteristics ==
Batwing antennas are a specialized type of crossed dipole antenna, a variant of the turnstile antenna. Two pairs of identical vertical batwing-shaped elements are mounted at right angles around a common mast. Element “wings” on opposite sides are fed as a dipole. To generate an omnidirectional pattern, the two dipoles are fed 90° out of phase. The antenna radiates horizontally polarized radiation in the horizontal plane. Each group of four elements at a single level is referred to as a bay. The radiation pattern is close to omnidirectional but has four small lobes (maxima) in the directions of the four elements.

To reduce power radiated in the unwanted axial directions, in broadcast applications multiple bays fed in phase are stacked vertically with a spacing of approximately one wavelength, to create a collinear array. This generates an omnidirectional radiation pattern with increased horizontal gain (more of the energy radiated in horizontal directions and less into the sky or down at the earth), suitable for terrestrial broadcasting.

The "batwing" shape of the elements is adapted from the butterfly antenna (a flattened biconical antenna), used because it gives the antenna a wide bandwidth of approximately 20% of operating frequency at a VSWR of 1.1:1. This makes the antenna design suitable for broadcasters who wish to use a single antenna to transmit multiple television signals and thus made the batwing the preferred antenna for lowband TV stations (Band I; channels 2–6) in the early days of broadcast television.

== See also ==
- Turnstile antenna

== Sources ==
- Lo, Y.T.; Lee, S.W. (31 October 1993). Antenna Handbook. Vol. III: Antenna Applications. Springer. ISBN 0442015941. ISBN 978-0442015947
- Markley, Don (1 Apr 2004). "Television antenna systems". Broadcast Engineering.
- Milligan, Thomas A. (2005). Modern Antenna Design. Wiley-IEEE Press. ISBN 978-0-471-45776-3.
- Sclater, Neil (1999). Electronics Technology Handbook. McGraw-Hill Professional. ISBN 0-07-058048-0.
