= KOTN (Pine Bluff, Arkansas) =

- Pine Bluff, Arkansas; United States
- Frequency: 1490 kHz

Ownership
- Owner: Community Broadcast Group Inc.; (M.R.S. Ventures, Inc.)
- Sister stations: KPBQ-FM; KZYP; KCLA

History
- First air date: 1934
- Last air date: 2007
- Call sign meaning: "Cotton"

Technical information
- Facility ID: 4236
- Class: C
- Power: 1,000 watts
- Transmitter coordinates: 34°13′15″N 91°58′20″W

KOTN (1490 AM) was a commercial radio station licensed to serve Pine Bluff, Arkansas, United States. The station, established in 1934, was most recently owned by Community Broadcast Group Inc. and the broadcast license held by M.R.S. Ventures, Inc. When it signed off permanently in early 2007, it had been broadcasting a talk and sports format branded as "Information Radio". The station was assigned the KOTN call letters by the Federal Communications Commission.

== Ownership ==
KOTN had been on the air since 1934 and was one of south Arkansas' oldest stations. Buddy Deane bought the station in 1960 and moved from Baltimore, where he had hosted a dance show known as The Buddy Deane Show, in 1964. (This show was parodied as the Corny Collins Show by John Waters in the film Hairspray.) He sold KOTN in 1983 but bought it back in 1995. Deane retired from broadcasting in May 2003 after completing the sale of his family's radio stations and died shortly thereafter in July 2003.

In April 2002, Tyler, Texas-based Community Broadcast Group Inc., through its MRS Ventures subsidiary, purchased four Pine Bluff radio stations from SeArk Radio and Delta Radio of Pine Bluff. SeArk Radio, owned by Dawn Deane, sold FM stations KPBQ-FM and KZYP plus AM station KCLA. Delta Radio, owned by W.M. "Buddy" and Helen Deane, sold AM station KOTN. KOTN sold for a reported $350,000 and the other three sold for a combined $1.05 million.

In June 2006, the station's owner, Jerry D. Russell, suffered a stroke. The station was being operated by another broadcaster, Hodges Broadcasting LLC, under a local marketing agreement but that operator was unable to obtain the financing to purchase the station. With Hodges gone and Russell unable to operate the station himself, KOTN went off the air for good in early 2007. In a February 2011 letter to the FCC, the owner indicated that he was surrendering the station's broadcast license as well as the licenses for ten sister stations in similar dire circumstances. On May 2, 2011, the station's license was cancelled and the KOTN call sign assignment was deleted permanently from the FCC database.
