= American Bandstand =

American music television series (1952–1989)

- Logo used from 1969 to 1987
- Also known as: Bandstand (1952–1957)
- Genre: Music; Talk show
- Presented by: Bob Horn; Lee Stewart; Tony Mammarella; Dick Clark; David Hirsch
- Announcer: Charlie O'Donnell
- Country of origin: United States
- No. of seasons: 37; (5–WFIL); (30–ABC); (1–Syndication); (1–USA Network)
- No. of episodes: 3,002

Production
- Running time: 90 minutes; 60 minutes (originally 2½ hours on WFIL-TV/Philadelphia only)
- Production companies: Dick Clark Productions (1964–1989, 2002); WFIL-TV (1952–1964)

Original release
- Network: WFIL-TV
- Release: October 7, 1952 – August 2, 1957
- Network: ABC (daytime)
- Release: August 5, 1957 – September 6, 1963
- Network: ABC (Saturdays)
- Release: September 7, 1963 – September 5, 1987
- Network: Syndicated
- Release: September 19, 1987 – June 4, 1988
- Network: USA Network
- Release: April 8 – October 7, 1989
- Network: ABC
- Release: May 3, 2002

American Bandstand is an American music and dance television program, aired in various versions from 1952 to 1989. Its best-known incarnation was hosted and produced by Dick Clark, who served as the show's primary presenter for over three decades.

The program featured teenagers dancing to popular songs from the Top 40 charts. It was originally broadcast from Philadelphia, where it remained from its debut in 1952 until relocating to Los Angeles in 1964.

During its run, a wide range of musical acts appeared on the show, generally lip-syncing to one of their latest singles. Artists performed for a studio audience while the original recordings played for viewers at home. Freddy Cannon holds the record for the most appearances, with 110.

== History ==
=== 1950s ===
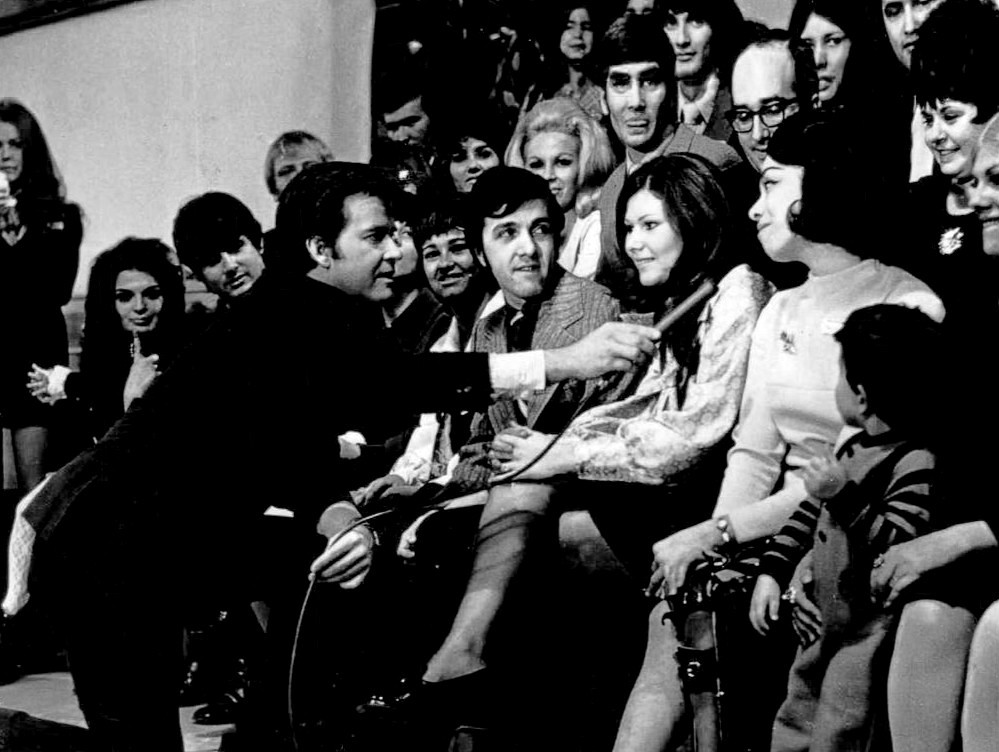
Host Dick Clark talks to Myrna Horowitz, one of the original dancers when the program began in 1952, during the show's 18th anniversary in 1970

American Bandstand premiered locally in late March 1952 as Bandstand on Philadelphia television station WFIL-TV Channel 6 (now WPVI-TV). Hosted by Bob Horn as a television adjunct to his radio show of the same name on WFIL, Bandstand featured short musical films produced by Snader Telescriptions and Official Films, with occasional studio guests. This incarnation was an early version of the music video shows that would increasingly appear in the 1980s.

Desiring a pivot, Horn wanted to change the show to a dance program featuring teenagers dancing on camera as music records played. The radio show, The 950 Club, hosted by Joe Grady and Ed Hurst, inspired the format, which aired on Philadelphia's WPEN.

On October 7, 1952, this new version of Bandstand debuted from Studio B, located in the original 1947 building in West Philadelphia. It was hosted by Horn and co-hosted by Lee Stewart from its launch in 1952 until 1955.

Stewart owned a TV and radio business in Philadelphia and had an advertising account with WFIL-TV. He was included in the program to maintain the advertising account. However, as WFIL-TV grew financially and the importance of his advertising account diminished, Stewart's presence on the program was no longer necessary. Tony Mammarella was the original producer with Ed Yates as director. Snader and Official music films continued in the short term to fill gaps when dancers were changed during the show because the studio could not fit more than 200 attendees.

On July 9, 1956, Horn was fired following a drunk driving arrest, and he was also reportedly involved in a prostitution ring, for which he faced morality charges. WFIL and its co-owner, Walter Annenberg's The Philadelphia Inquirer, were running a series on drunk driving at the time of Horn's arrest. Mammarella temporarily replaced Horn before the job went to Dick Clark permanently.

In late spring of 1957, ABC asked its owned-and-operated stations and affiliates for programming suggestions to fill their 3:30 p.m. ET time slot. In Philadelphia, WFIL was already pre-empting ABC programming with Bandstand. Clark presented the show to ABC president Thomas W. Moore, and after negotiations, it was picked up for national broadcast, becoming American Bandstand on August 5, 1957, hosted by Dick Clark. One show from this first season of American Bandstand on December 18, 1957, identified as the "Second National Broadcast," is preserved in the archives of the Museum of Broadcast Communications in Chicago.

One market not broadcasting Bandstand was ABC's then-Baltimore affiliate WJZ-TV Channel 13 (formerly WAAM), which chose to produce its own local dance show in the same afternoon time slot. Local radio disc jockey Buddy Deane was chosen as the host of The Buddy Deane Show on WJZ-TV, and began a daily two-hour broadcast on September 9, 1957. This led to competition between American Bandstand and The Buddy Deane Show. When performers who debuted on Bandstand first appeared on Deane's program, they were asked to not mention their prior appearance with Clark. The Buddy Deane Show aired on WJZ-TV until January 4, 1964.

The show was briefly shot in color in 1958 when WFIL-TV began experimenting with the new technology. With the larger size of the color camera, it was only possible to have one RCA TK-41 where three RCA TK-10s had been used before, as production needed to maintain as much dance space as possible in the studio. WFIL reverted to the TK-10s two weeks later when ABC refused to carry the color signal and management realized that the show needed multiple black-and-white cameras to capture more angles.

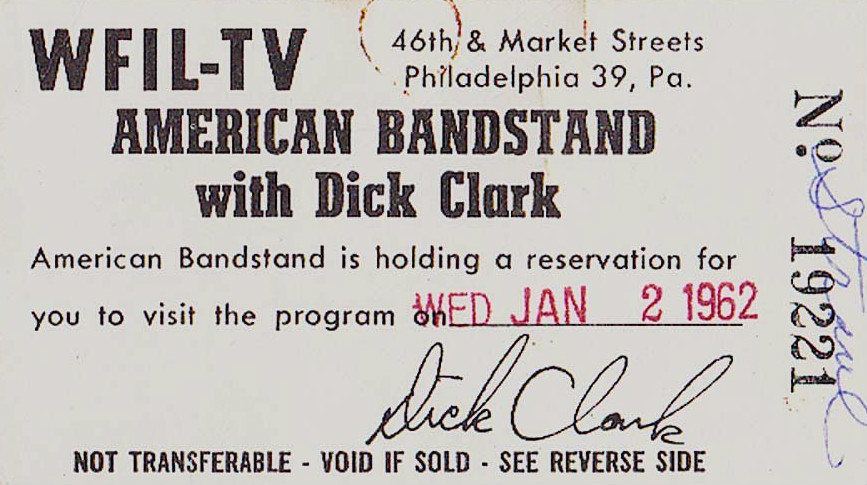
A January 1962 ticket for a broadcast of the show from Philadelphia

When ABC picked up the game show Do You Trust Your Wife? from CBS in November 1957, they renamed the program Who Do You Trust? and scheduled the program at 3:30 p.m. ET, almost halfway through Bandstand's slot. Instead of shortening or moving Bandstand, ABC opted to air Bandstand at 3:00 p.m., cut away to Who Do You Trust? at 3:30 p.m., then rejoin Bandstand at 4:00 p.m. However, WFIL decided to broadcast Bandstand in its entirety and air Who Do You Trust? at a later time for local Philadelphia viewers.

A half-hour evening version of American Bandstand aired on Monday nights from 7:30 p.m. to 8:00 p.m. ET, beginning on October 7, 1957, preceding The Guy Mitchell Show. Both shows received low ratings and were cancelled shortly after their debut. The Monday night version aired its last program in December 1957, but ABC gave Clark a Saturday night time slot for The Dick Clark Saturday Night Beechnut Show, which originated from the Little Theatre in Manhattan, beginning February 15, 1958.

The program was broadcast live on weekday afternoons, and by 1959, the show had a national audience of approximately 20 million viewers. In the fall of 1961, ABC truncated American Bandstand's airtime from 90 to 60 minutes (4:00–5:00 p.m. ET), then even further as a daily half-hour (4:00–4:30 p.m. ET) program in September 1962. Beginning in early 1963, all five shows for the upcoming week were videotaped the previous Saturday. The use of videotape allowed Clark to produce and host a series of concert tours based on the success of American Bandstand and pursue other broadcast interests.

=== 1960s ===
On September 7, 1963, American Bandstand shifted from a weekday schedule to a weekly broadcast format, airing every Saturday afternoon in a reinstated one-hour time slot, returning to the format used in earlier broadcasts.

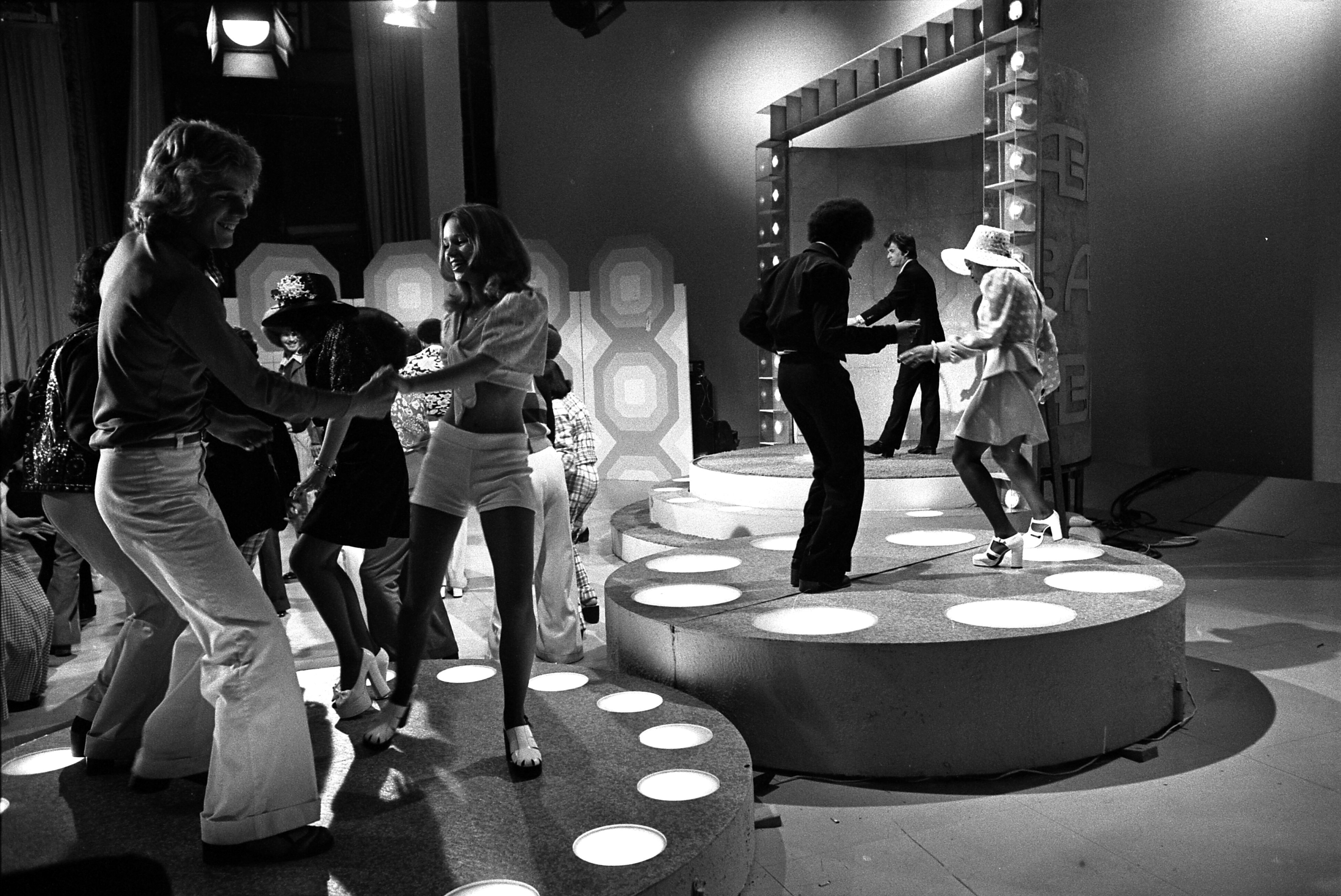
American Bandstand in 1973

When WFIL-TV moved to a new facility on City Line Avenue, the new facility lacked a studio that could accommodate the show, ABC moved production of Bandstand to the ABC Television Center in Los Angeles, now known as The Prospect Studios, on February 8, 1964. Prior to the move, Bandstand featured many of its up-and-coming acts from Philadelphia's Cameo-Parkway Records. The move to California coincided with a downturn in Cameo-Parkway Records' influence, which diminished the exposure many of its artists.

The program was broadcast in color starting on September 9, 1967. The typical production schedule consisted of videotaping three shows on a Saturday and three shows on a Sunday, every six weeks. The shows were usually produced in either Stage 54 or Stage 55 at ABC Television Center.

In September 1964, Bandstand began using a new logo based on the ABC circle logo, reading "ab" in the same typeface followed by a number representing the year the show aired. This started with "'65" and continued annually through "'69" when each year arrived. On September 13, 1969, the Bandstand set was given a complete overhaul, and Les Elgart's big band version of "Bandstand Boogie" was replaced by a new theme composed by Mike Curb. The "ab" logo was replaced with the stylized "AB" logo, which remained in use and was used for the remainder of the show's run. This set and theme music were used until August 31, 1974, when the show unveiled a new set and an updated version of "Bandstand Boogie."

=== 1970s ===
For a brief time in 1973, Bandstand alternated its time slot with Soul Unlimited, a show featuring soul music that was hosted by Buster Jones. Soul Unlimited faced criticism from some African-American viewers who questioned Clark's role as a white producer and accused the show of reinforcing racial stereotypes. Don Cornelius, the creator-producer and host of Soul Train, along with Jesse Jackson, publicly opposed Clark's involvement in the new program, and it was canceled within weeks. Set pieces from Soul Unlimited were utilized by Bandstand for its 1974–1978 set design.

=== 1980s ===
During the early 1980s, American Bandstand experienced a steady decline in ratings. This was largely due to increased competition from emerging music television formats such as MTV, as well as a growing number of music programs across other networks. Many ABC affiliates began preempting or rescheduling the show, further reducing its viewership. Additionally, the show's time slot was frequently overtaken by college football broadcasts, which had expanded significantly following a 1984 court-ordered deregulation.

==== 1985: 33 1/3rd anniversary and 1989 cancellation ====
On December 1, 1985, American Bandstand aired a special 33 1/3rd anniversary broadcast on ABC. The show featured performances by numerous recording artists, guest appearances, and archival footage from past screenings. Performing artists included Rod Stewart, Dionne Warwick, and Donna Summer.

On September 13, 1986, ABC reduced Bandstand from a full hour to thirty minutes at Clark's request. On September 5, 1987, the final ABC installment (with Laura Branigan performing "Shattered Glass") aired.

Hey, our thanks to Laura Branigan for joining us here on American Bandstand today. I hope you've had a good half-hour. Come and join us two weeks from today for an hour version of American Bandstand on Saturday, September 19. We'll see you then. In the meantime, have a wonderful week or two. We'll see you the next time on American Bandstand. For now, Dick Clark on ABC, so long.

— Dick Clark's final message on the final episode of American Bandstand to be broadcast on ABC from September 5, 1987.

Two weeks later, Bandstand moved to first-run syndication. Dubbed as The New American Bandstand and distributed by LBS Communications, the series' tapings were moved from the ABC Television Center to the Hollywood studios of Los Angeles's PBS member station KCET, with a new set similar to that of Soul Train. Clark continued as host of the series, which was returned to a one-hour format, and aired on KYW-TV in Philadelphia and WWOR-TV in New York City (a Superstation status that also gave the program further national exposure), KTLA in Los Angeles, WMAQ-TV in Chicago, WDIV in Detroit, WEWS in Cleveland, WTMJ-TV in Milwaukee, and WCIX in Miami. The first syndicated episode aired on the weekend of September 19, 1987. The run was short-lived, lasting until June 4, 1988.

After a ten-month hiatus, Bandstand moved to cable on USA Network on April 8, 1989, with comedian David Hirsch taking over as host. In another format shift, the show was shot outdoors at Universal Studios Hollywood. Clark remained with the show, serving as its executive producer.

This iteration of the show, however, was also brief, lasting twenty-six weeks before it was canceled. Its final show, with The Cover Girls performing "My Heart Skips a Beat" and "We Can't Go Wrong", aired on October 7, 1989, ending the show's thity-seven-year run.

The show was a ratings success from 1957 to 1979, but by the early and mid 1980s, ratings had started to decline. By the late 1980s, the show's ratings had dropped significantly, its traditional live format of teenagers dancing to popular hits increasingly viewed as outdated, compared to newer music programs such as cable channel MTV and Soul Train, which offered music videos, artist interviews, and more edgy content. The show was finally canceled in 1989.

Well, it's our last show here on Bandstand and I really want to thank the viewers who have kept American Bandstand on the air all these years. Dick Clark, wherever you are, we miss you. I tried my best to fill your shoes and I hope I have lived up to what you were expecting of me. American Bandstand will be back someday, I assure you. I'm David Hirsch and, on behalf of American Bandstand, I bid you, for the last time, goodbye.

— David Hirsch signing off for the last time on American Bandstand's final regular episode on October 7, 1989.

=== 2002: 50th anniversary ===
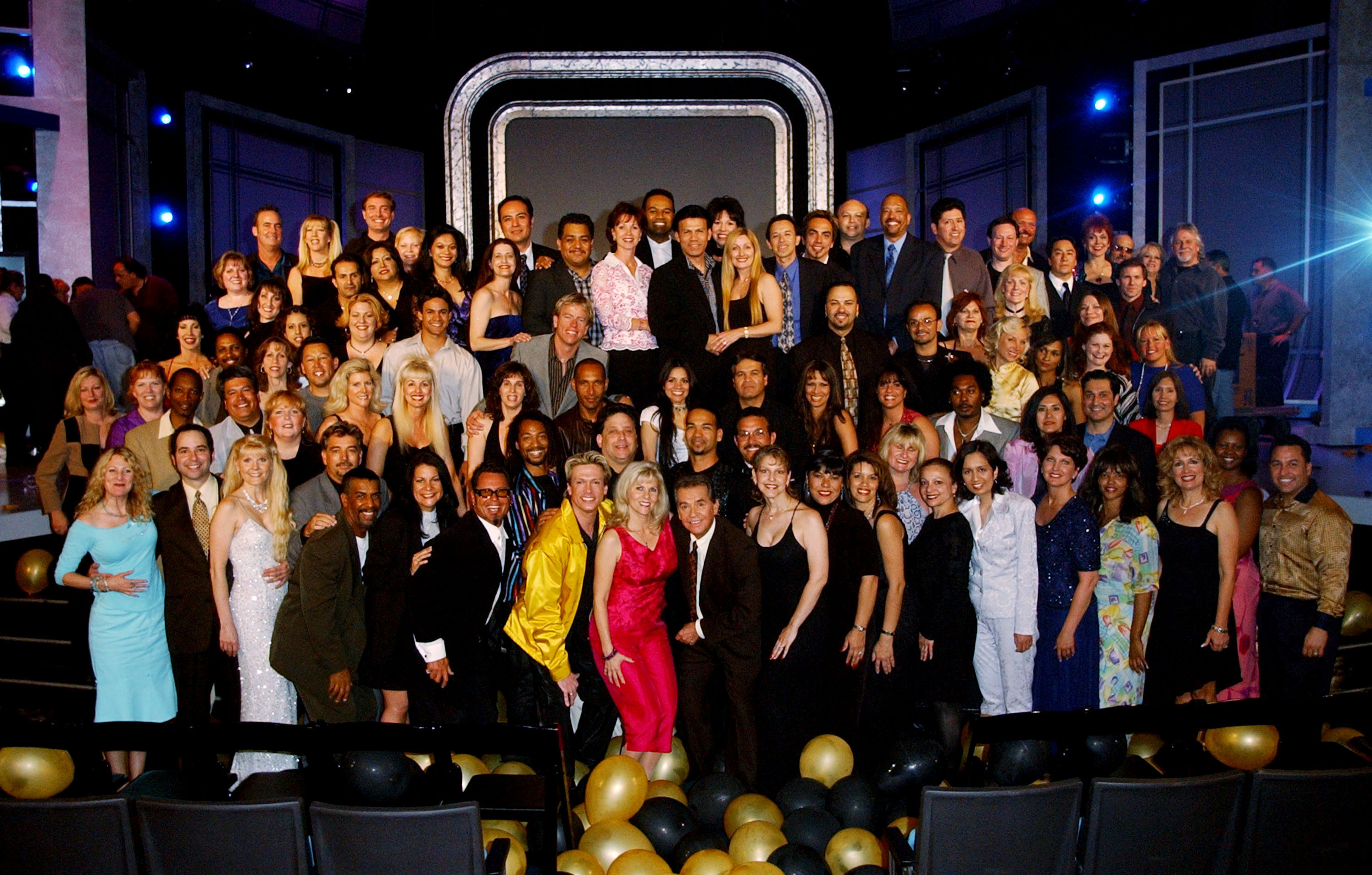
American Bandstand's 50th anniversary reunion in 2002

On May 3, 2002, Dick Clark hosted a one-off special 50th anniversary edition on ABC. Michael Jackson, a frequent Bandstand guest, performed "Dangerous." The Village People performed their song "YMCA" for the audience in Pasadena, California. Other performers, including Brandy, members of Kiss, Dennis Quaid and his band The Sharks, Cher, and Stevie Wonder performed in honor of the long-running program.

== Program features ==
=== Rate-a-Record ===
Clark regularly asked teenagers their opinions of the songs being played through the "Rate-a-Record" segment. During the segment, two audience members each ranked two records on a scale of 35 to 98. After which their two opinions were averaged by Clark, who then asked the chosen members to justify their scores. The segment gave rise to the catchphrase "It's got a good beat and you can dance to it."

=== Hosts ===
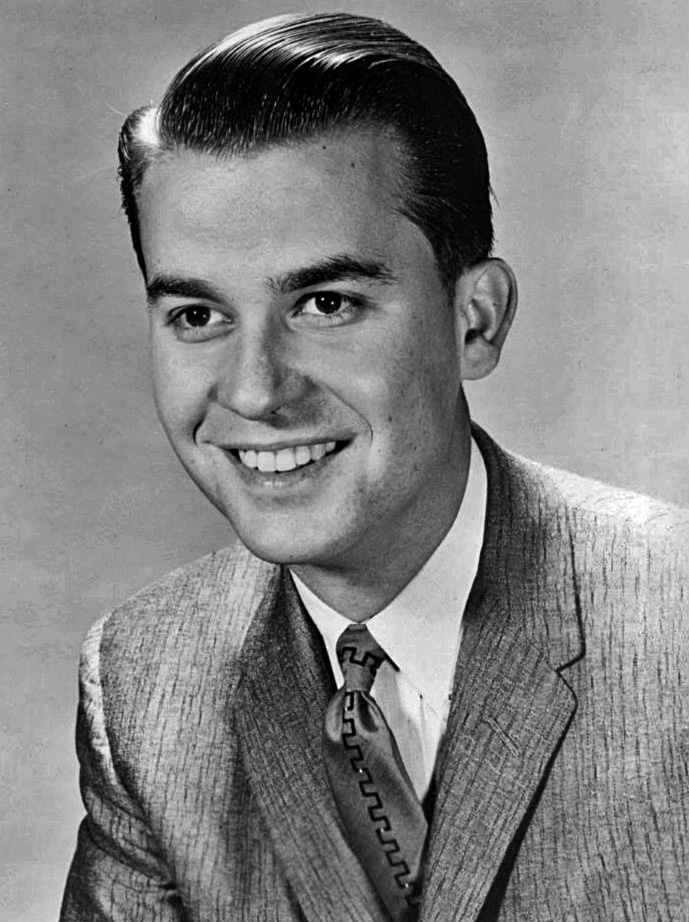
Dick Clark in a promotional image for American Bandstand in 1961

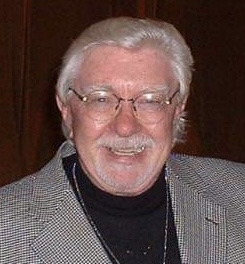
Charlie O'Donnell, the show's announcer

Donna Summer was the only singer to co-host the show with Dick Clark, joining him on May 27, 1978, for a special episode dedicated to the release of the Casablanca Records film Thank God It's Friday. From the late 1950s and most of the 1960s, Clark's on-camera sidekick was announcer Charlie O'Donnell, who later went on to announce Wheel of Fortune and other programs hosted or produced by Clark, such as The $100,000 Pyramid. In occasional shows not hosted by Clark, a substitute host (among them Rick Azar) was brought in.

=== Theme music ===
Bandstand originally used "High Society" by Artie Shaw as its theme song, but by the time the show went national, it had been replaced by various arrangements of Charles Albertine's "Bandstand Boogie," including Les Elgart's big-band recording. From 1969 to 1974, "Bandstand Theme," a synthesized rock instrumental co-written by Mike Curb, opened each show. From 1974 to 1977, there was a newer orchestral disco version of "Bandstand Boogie," arranged and performed by Joe Porter, played during the opening and closing credits. Elgart's version was released as a single in March 1954 (Columbia 40180) as well as Curb's theme (by "Mike Curb & The Waterfall") in October 1969 (Forward 124).

From 1977 to September 6, 1986, the show opened and closed with Barry Manilow's rendition of "Bandstand Boogie," which he originally recorded for his 1975 album Tryin' to Get the Feeling. This version introduced lyrics written by Manilow and Bruce Sussman, referencing elements of the series (the previous theme was retained as bumper music). From September 13, 1986, to September 5, 1987, Manilow's version was replaced at the close of the show by a new closing theme arranged by David Russo, who also performed an updated instrumental arrangement of "Bandstand Boogie" when Bandstand went into syndication.

From 1974 to September 6, 1986, Bandstand featured another instrumental at its mid-show break: Billy Preston's synth hit "Space Race".

== Civil rights and discrimination ==
Originally located in Philadelphia, Bandstand was influenced by racial segregation laws in nearby Maryland and Delaware. Although the show was never explicitly segregated and featured Black R&B performers such as The Chords, producers sought to increase marketability in segregated states and avoid alienating white viewers by effectively segregating the audience beginning in 1954. Policies to limit Black attendance included abolishing first-come, first-served ticketing for local residents, favoring repeat attendees in ticket allocation, promoting tickets in majority-white suburbs, and only responding to mail-in ticket requests from individuals with European surnames.

In response, Black teenagers began requesting tickets under assumed names to gain admission, but often faced harassment and conflicts with white audience members. Concerned about the potential impact of these incidents on advertisers and audience participation, Bandstand producers petitioned the Philadelphia Commission on Human Relations to investigate. Bob Horn and other producers testified that the show did not have any discriminatory policies, and in 1955 the Commission concluded that although admission policies and the resulting conflicts led to "the absence of Negroes from attendance," there were insufficient grounds for a discrimination lawsuit.

Dick Clark claimed in his autobiography that he was responsible for desegregating the show's audience shortly after taking over in 1957. However, review of footage of the show's audience reveals that it remained almost exclusively white until it relocated to Los Angeles in 1964.

== Revival plans ==
In 2004, Dick Clark, with the help of Ryan Seacrest, announced plans to revive the show in time for the 2005 season; although this did not occur (due in part to Clark suffering a severe stroke in late 2004), one segment of the revived Bandstand eventually became the series So You Think You Can Dance.

Dick Clark died on April 18, 2012, at the age of 82.

== Legacy ==
American Bandstand
- Location within Philadelphia
- 39.9585°N 75.21259°W
- Location: 4548 Market St., Philadelphia, Pennsylvania, U.S.

American Bandstand served as an early national television platform for artists such as Prince, Jackson 5, Sonny and Cher, Aerosmith, and John Lydon's PiL—all of whom made their American TV debuts on the show. American Bandstand's Top 40 hits were matched with routines performed by teenagers, which were designed to appeal to that demographic. It also influenced later musical television programs, including MTV and Fox's reality-competition show American Idol.

== See also ==
- List of acts who appeared on American Bandstand
- Bandstand, Australian version loosely based on the American version
- Top of the Pops, a similar British music program
- The Buddy Deane Show
- Soul Train
- The Midnight Special
- The Clay Cole Show
- Electric Circus
- CD USA
