= Tony Mammarella =

American producer (1924–1977)

Anthony (Tony) Mammarella (September 2, 1924 – November 29, 1977) was the first producer and second host of American Bandstand.

== Biography ==
Mammarella, a World War II veteran, started with Philadelphia television station WFIL-TV in 1947 as a switchboard operator and moved his way up to various positions in production.

In 1958, as a way of increasing his financial portfolio, he, along with Dick Clark and Bernie Binnick started Swan Records, with the first signed artist being "Dickie Doo and the Don'ts". The label would later be notable for being the second American record label for The Beatles.

Once the payola scandals of 1959 played out, ABC required anybody that dealt with music to diversify from any music interests. Clark decided to stay with ABC and Mammarella stayed with Swan. In this context, he wrote and arranged a number of songs under the name Anthony September, including; ""Ninety-Nine Ways", "Butterfly", "Lock Up Your Heart", "Cryin' The Blues" & "Everybody Loves Saturday Night". Some of these were recorded at various times by Tab Hunter, Connie Francis, Andy Williams, Peter Kraus, Dick Williams, and Billy Williams.

== Illness and death ==
Mammarella succumbed to metastatic lung cancer on November 29, 1977.

== Legacy ==
The Broadcast Pioneers of Philadelphia posthumously inducted Mammarella into their Hall of Fame in 2009.
