= Turnstile antenna =

Set of two dipole antennas

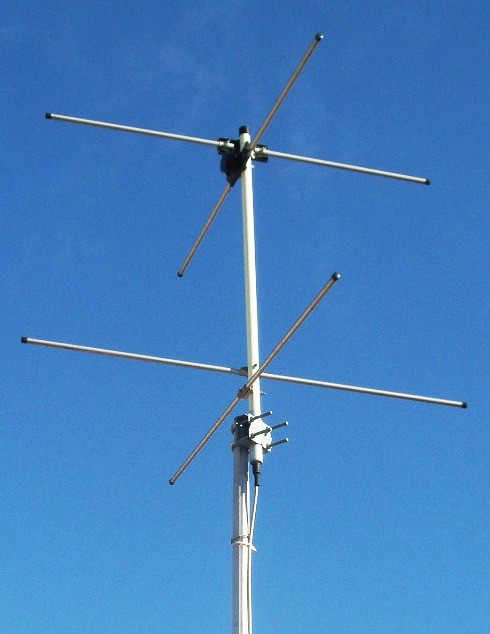
An axial-mode turnstile antenna for 136–137 MHz to receive data from weather satellites, consisting of a pair of driven crossed dipoles above a pair passive crossed dipoles serving as a reflector.

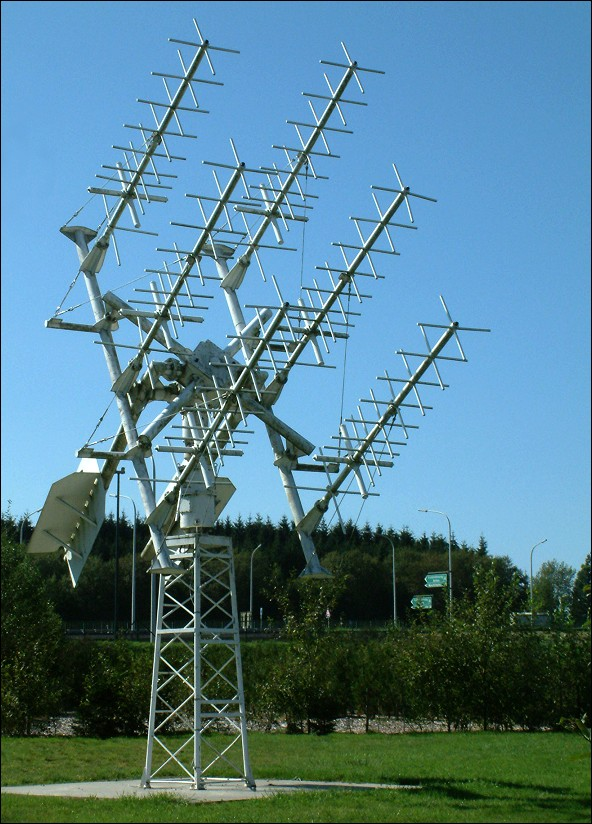
High gain axial mode Yagi turnstile array used to communicate with weather satellites on 136–137 MHz at Redu, Belgium. Each of the 6 components of the array consists of two 9-element Yagi antennas mounted on the same axis at right angles and fed in quadrature to radiate a narrow beam of circularly polarized radio waves

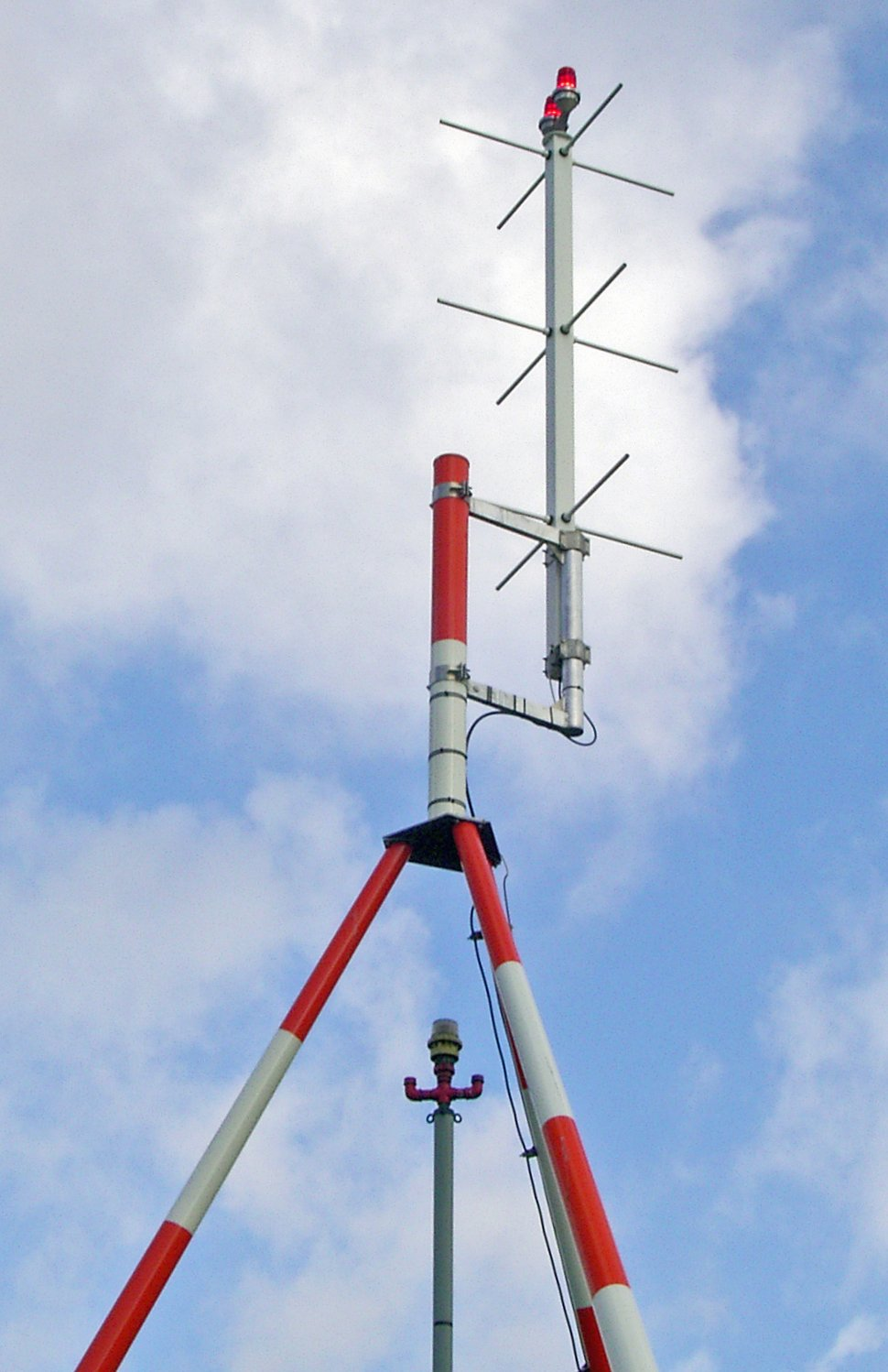
Turnstile antenna of a Ground Based Augmentation System for the frequency band 112 to 117.975 MHz

A turnstile antenna, or crossed-dipole antenna, is a radio antenna consisting of a set of two identical dipole antennas mounted at right angles to each other and fed in phase quadrature; the two currents applied to the dipoles are 90° out of phase. The name reflects the notion the antenna looks like a turnstile when mounted horizontally. The antenna can be used in two possible modes. In normal mode the antenna radiates horizontally polarized radio waves perpendicular to its axis. In axial mode the antenna radiates circularly polarized radiation along its axis.

Specialized normal mode turnstile antennas called superturnstile or batwing antennas are used as television broadcasting antennas. Axial mode turnstiles are widely used for satellite ground station antennas in the VHF and UHF bands, as circular polarization is often used for satellite communication since it is not sensitive to the orientation of the satellite antenna in space.

== History ==
The turnstile antenna was invented by George Brown in 1935 and described in scholarship in 1936. The patent history reveals the popularity of the turnstile antenna over the years.

== Characteristics ==
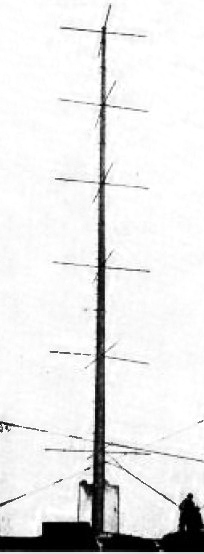
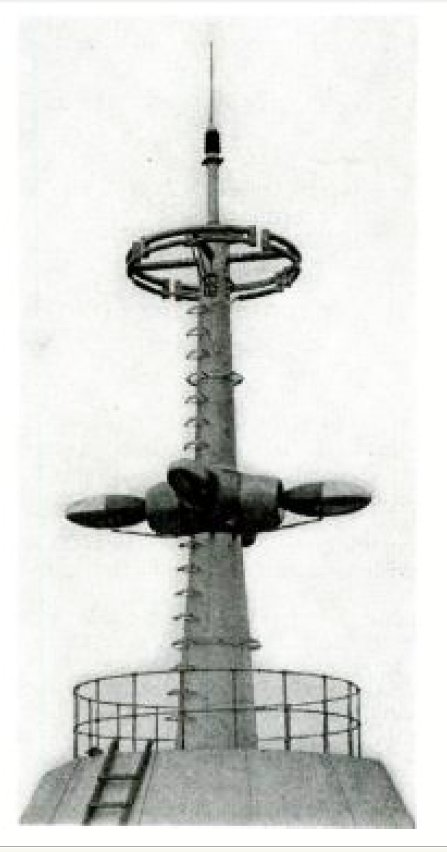
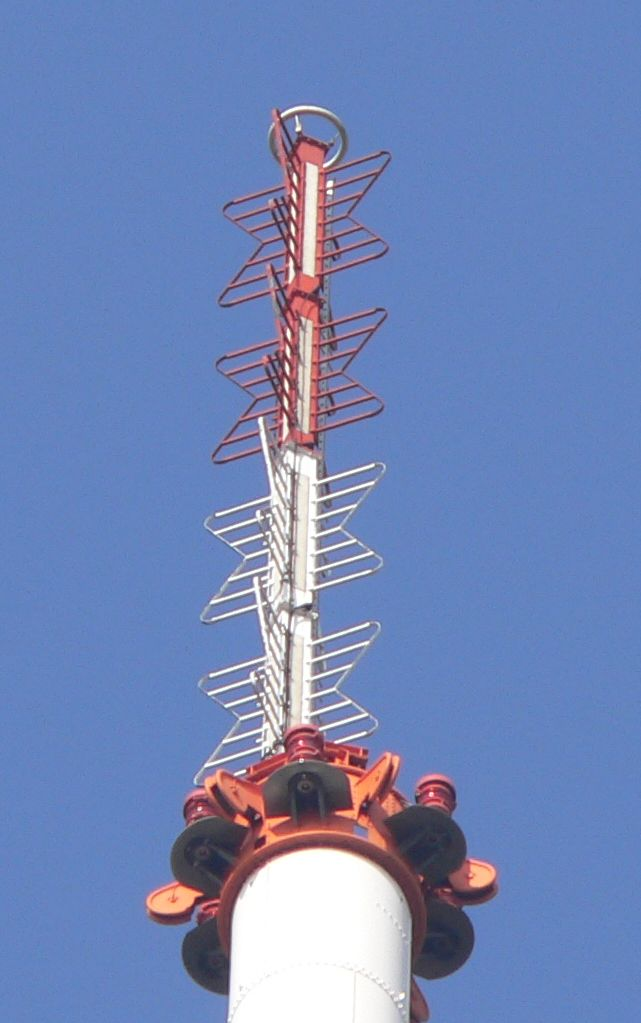
- (left) First turnstile antenna, a normal-mode array built by station W8XH, Buffalo, NY, in 1936 that broadcast on 41 MHz
- (center) Normal-mode turnstile (lower antenna) on the Empire State Building in New York City for NBC's experimental 46.5 MHz TV station W2XBS in 1939. The cigar-shaped elements gave the antenna a wider bandwidth of 30 MHz necessary for TV transmission.
- (right) Specialized type of normal mode turnstile antenna used for television broadcasting, called a superturnstile or batwing antenna

The antenna can be used in two different modes: normal mode and axial mode.

=== Normal mode ===
In directions perpendicular to its axis the antenna radiates linearly polarized radio waves (horizontally polarized when the antenna's axis is vertical). This is called normal mode. The radiation pattern, a superposition of the two dipole patterns, is close to omnidirectional but actually "cloverleaf shaped", with four small maxima off the ends of the elements. The pattern departs from omnidirectional by only ±5 percent. The radiation in these horizontal directions is often increased by vertically stacking multiple turnstile antennas (called "bays") fed in phase. This increases the gain by strengthening the radiation in the desired horizontal directions but causes partial cancellation of the radiation in vertical directions, reducing power wasted radiated into the sky or down toward the earth. These stacked normal mode turnstile antennas are used at VHF and UHF frequencies for FM and television broadcasting.

Since the first turnstiles invented by Brown operated in this mode, the normal mode turnstile is occasionally called the George Brown turnstile antenna.

=== Axial mode ===
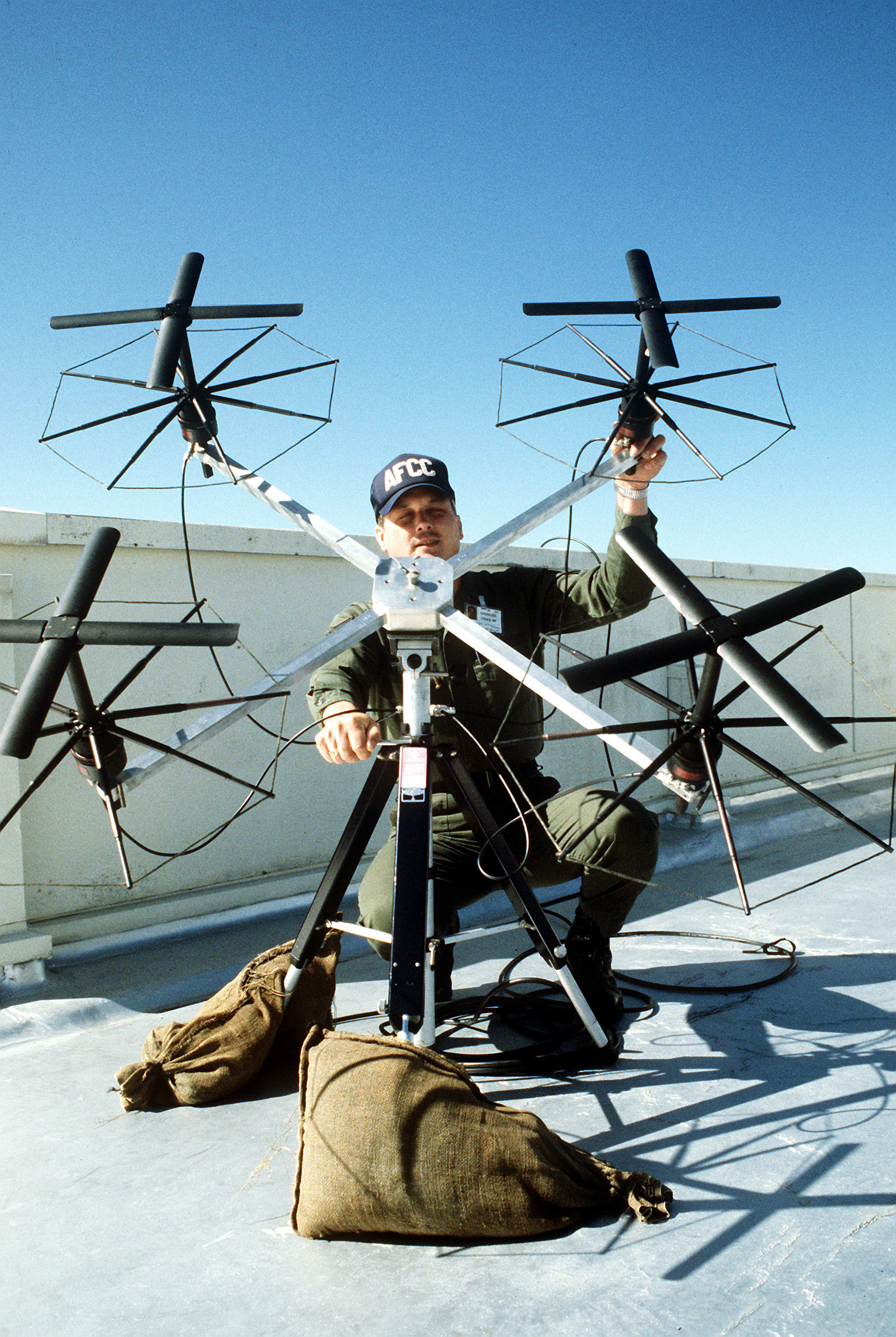
Array of 4 axial-mode turnstiles for portable military satellite communication terminal

Off the ends of the antenna's axis, perpendicular to the plane of the elements, the antenna radiates circularly-polarized (CP) radio waves. This is called axial mode. The radiation off one end is righthand-circularly-polarized and the other end is lefthand-circularly-polarized. Which end produces which polarization is determined by the phase of the feed connections. Since in a directional antenna only a single beam is wanted, in a simple axial-mode antenna a flat conducting surface such as a metal screen reflector is added, a quarter-wavelength behind the crossed elements. The waves in that direction are reflected back 180° and the reflection reverses the polarization sense, so the reflected waves reinforce the forward radiation. For example, if the radio waves radiated forward are right-circularly-polarized, the waves radiated backwards will be left-circularly-polarized. The flat reflector reverses the polarization sense so the reflected waves are right-circularly-polarized. By locating the reflector λ/4 behind the elements the direct and reflected waves are in phase and add. Addition of the reflector increases the axial radiation by a factor of 2 (3 dB).

Another common way to increase the axial mode radiation is to replace each dipole with a Yagi array.

In a circularly polarized antenna, it is important that the direction of polarization of the transmitting and receiving antennas be the same, since a right-circularly-polarized antenna will suffer a severe loss of gain receiving left-circularly-polarized radio waves, and vice versa.

Axial mode turnstile antennas are often used for satellite and missile antennas, since circular polarization is used in satellite communication. This is because with circularly polarized waves the relative orientation of the antenna elements does not affect the gain.

== Feeding the antenna ==
For the antenna to function, the two dipoles must be fed with currents of equal magnitude in phase quadrature, meaning the phase of the sine waves must be 90° apart. This is done with feed-line techniques or by adding reactance in series with the dipoles.

=== Quadrature feed ===
A popular method of feeding the two dipoles in a turnstile antenna is to split the RF signal from the transmission line into two equal signals with a two way splitter, then delay one by 90 degrees additional electrical length. Each phase is applied to one of the dipoles.

=== Modified dipole dimensions ===
By modifying the length and shape of the dipoles, the combined terminal impedance presented to a single feed-point can achieve pure resistance and yield quadrature currents in each dipole. This method of changing the physical dimensions of the antenna element to yield quadrature currents is known as turnstile feeding.

== Applications ==
=== Stacked arrays ===
Brown's original patent described stacking multiple turnstile antennas vertically to make a high gain horizontally polarized omnidirectional antenna for radio broadcasting. These were used for some of the first FM broadcasting antennas in the 1930s. However most modern FM broadcast antennas use circular polarization so the signal strength will not vary with the orientation of the receiver's antenna.

=== Batwing or superturnstile array ===
A later innovation involved changing the shape of the dipole elements, from simple rods to broader shapes, to increase the bandwidth of the antenna. Early TV broadcast antennas used "cigar shaped" elements, shown in image of 1939 RCA Empire State Building antenna above. A common shape today is the batwing or superturnstile antenna, used for television broadcasting in the VHF or UHF bands The batwing shape of each element produces an antenna with wide impedance bandwidth. Up to eight batwing antennas are usually stacked vertically and fed in phase to make a high gain omnidirectional antenna for TV broadcasting. The wide bandwidth was needed at the low VHF analog TV broadcast band, as the 6 MHz TV channel bandwidth was about 10% of the frequency.

=== Spacecraft antennas ===
Circular polarization was used for spacecraft (satellite and missile) communication, since circular polarization is not sensitive to the relative orientation of the antennas, and the space vehicle's antenna could have any orientation with respect to the ground antenna. High gain Yagi turnstile antennas were often used for the ground station.

The US Nike missile program made use of the axial mode for telemetry and used the modified dipole technique to force the quadrature currents.

== Bibliography ==
- John Daniel Kraus (1988). Antennas (Subsequent ed.). McGraw-Hill College. p. 892. ISBN 978-0-070-35422-7. $ 16-7: Turnstile Antenna, pp. 726-729.
