= Ed Hurst =

American radio personality (1926–2020)

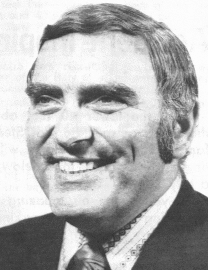
- Born: 16 July 1926 (age 100); Atlantic City, New Jersey, U.S.
- Died: 30 October 2020 (aged 94); Margate City, New Jersey, U.S.
- Other name: Stone-age Dick Clark
- Education: Atlantic City High School
- Occupations: Television and radio personality

Ed Hurst (July 16, 1926 – October 30, 2020) was an American radio and television personality. He referred to himself at one time as the "Stone-age Dick Clark".

== Early years ==
Hurst was born in Atlantic City, New Jersey and graduated from Atlantic City High School.

He started his career from 1943 to 1946 at WFPG, in Atlantic City. Hurst then did a radio show on WPEN-AM 950, out of Philadelphia, called The 950 Club with Joe Grady from 1946 (until 1955) before he teamed up with Joe Grady to do The Grady and Hurst Show on Philadelphia TV, which was broadcast in the tri-state area.

The Grady and Hurst Show, which started in 1952, was the first to show teens dancing (from 11 a.m. to noon every Saturday) in a studio. The groundbreaking format influenced programs like American Bandstand and others. The 950 Club on radio, which preceded The Grady and Hurst Show, was the first teenage show to have a studio audience (by invitation only) dance to the music on the air.

== Philadelphia TV ==
Hurst was on Philadelphia television from 1952 to 1978. During that time from 1952 to 1955, Hurst produced and performed on three television shows, all airing on WPTZ-TV. They were the aforementioned The Grady and Hurst Show, The Arthur Murray Party, a formal adult dance program, and The Plymouth Showroom, a variety program featuring popular recording artists. All three programs were rated number one in their respective time slots. In 1955, The Grady and Hurst Show moved to WPFH-TV in Wilmington, Delaware, where it enjoyed continued success. In 1958, the station moved to Philadelphia and became WVUE.

== Radio ==
In 1958, Hurst joined WRCV radio and TV, now known as KYW. He produced and performed on The Grady and Hurst Show morning radio program, as well as working on a TV show called Summertime on the Pier. In 1965, Ed launched yet another show, Ed Hurst at the Aquarama, a local variety series.

Hurst returned to WPEN in 1981 and stayed until 2005. His show was called the Steel Pier Radio Show for most of his time at WPEN. Although Hurst then retired, he eventually returned to radio on WIBG AM 1020, which was followed by WPG, WOND and back to WPG, where he worked until 2016. He also hosted Monsignor Bonner's Mixer Dance every Saturday night from 1967 until 1978.

== Honors ==
The Broadcast Pioneers of Philadelphia inducted Hurst into their Hall of Fame in 1996 and had named him Person of the Year in 1990, along with his broadcasting partner, Joe Grady. Grady and Hurst were also inducted into the Philadelphia Music Alliance "Walk of Fame" in 1993.

== Personal life ==
Hurst married his onetime producer, Cissie, and had two children: a daughter, Merle, and a son, Brian. He died at his home in Margate City, New Jersey, on October 30, 2020, aged 94.
