= Joe Grady =

American radio personality (1918–2000)

Joe Grady (September 23, 1918 – October 10, 2000) was an American radio personality.

== Biography ==
Grady was born in Philadelphia, Pennsylvania on September 23, 1918 and grew up in Broomall, Pennsylvania. Grady's first radio job was with WIP while attending La Salle University. He landed his first full-time broadcast job as a radio announcer at WHAT (AM), later becoming program director. In 1945, he joined WPEN, to do staff announcing but became a full-time radio announcer within a few months. In 1946, Ed Hurst joined WPEN, and with Grady originated the "950 Club". The show became Philadelphia's top rated radio program for the next decade. The show ran until 1955 and was a predecessor of American Bandstand.

In 1958, Grady joined WRCV radio and TV, now known as KYW on "The Grady and Hurst Show" morning radio program. Grady and Hurst rejoined WPEN in 1981, for a two-week reunion hosting "The 950 Club." The show became so popular again that they remained there until 1987 when Grady retired.

== Honors ==
He and Hurst were inducted into the Philadelphia Music Alliance in 1993 and have a star on the Walk of Fame. The Broadcast Pioneers of Philadelphia inducted Grady into their Hall of Fame in 1996 and named him Person of the Year in 1990, along with his broadcasting partner, Ed Hurst.
