= TV radio =

Type of radio receiver

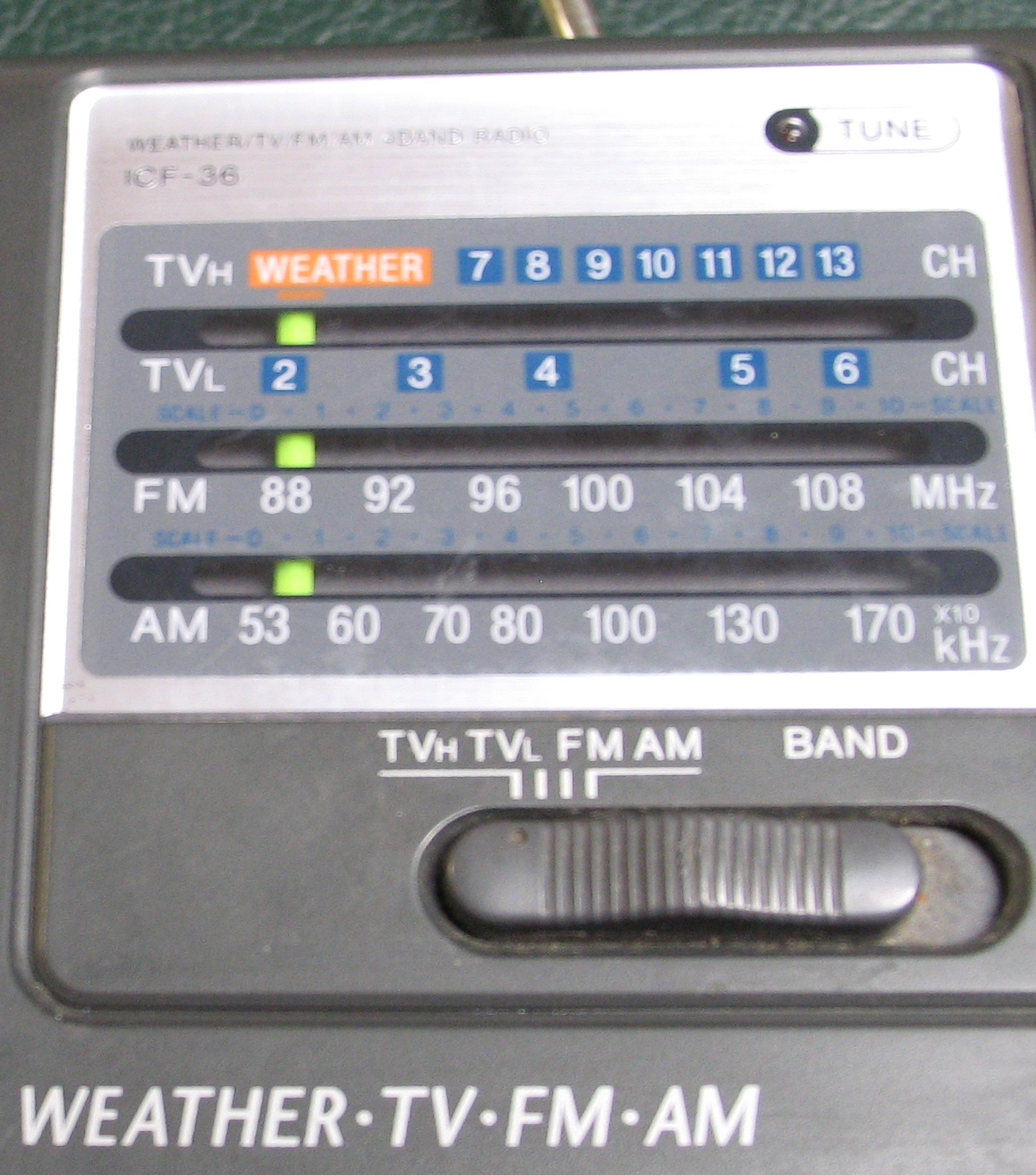
Close-up view of the audio bands on a Sony ICF-36 portable radio, manufactured in 2001. The TV audio bands are obsolete and not usable with digital TV channels.

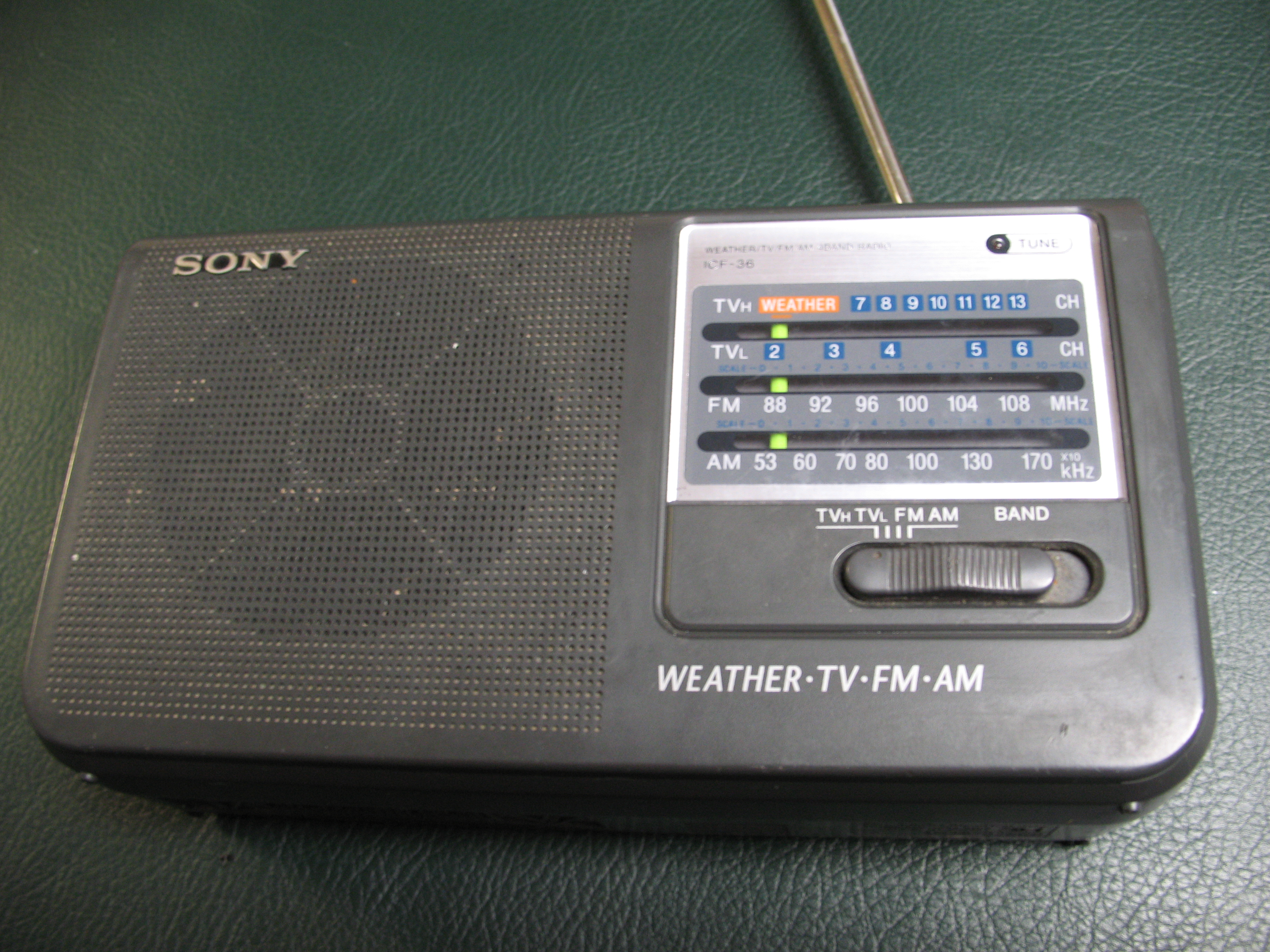
Overall view of portable radio

TV radio, TV band radio, and TV audio radio are common names for a type of radio receiver that can play the audio portion of a TV channel. The actual name of the device may comprise a list of all frequency bands the device can receive (e.g. AM, FM, weather, TV radio), one or two of which includes the TV channel bands.

== Analog tuning of analog TV audio ==
For the increasingly uncommon analog television standard, the audio for each TV channel is broadcast on a separate frequency band near the video signal frequency band (refer to article NTSC, Transmission modulation scheme). This audio signal can be heard separate from the video, using standard analog FM radios equipped with the appropriate tuning circuits.

== Design issues for tuning of digital TV audio ==
After the relatively recent transition of many countries to digital TV, no radio receiver manufacturer has developed an alternative method to play just the audio portion of digital TV channels. (DTV radio is not the same thing but in fact the opposite. The radio signal goes to the television receiver as opposed to the TV audio signal going to the radio receiver.)

DTV broadcasters can broadcast multiple separate video programs over one channel frequency in a digital subchannel, so it is necessary for a portable radio equipped with a digital audio decoder to do more than simply tune in to the frequency as with older analog receivers. It also needs to provide a way for the listener to choose among these digital subchannels, usually labeled as *.1, *.2, *.3, etc., on digital televisions with ATSC tuners. This is possible using an analog tuning dial to tune in to a digital TV broadcast, coupled with a button to select the digital subchannel.

Direct analog frequency tuning of digital TV is further complicated by the fact that digital TV broadcasting allows the use of virtual channel numbers that are separate from the actual broadcast frequency channel. In this manner, on a fully digital receiver, a station may appear to be on VHF channel 13 but actually broadcasts on UHF channel 33. This complexity is hidden from the users of fully digital receivers, but would be exposed to the user of an analog tuner with a subchannel selector.

A fully digital tuning system can hide these complexities from the user, but typically a digital tuner has to perform a special channel scan function to find available digital broadcasts. For a person traveling long distances with a digitally tuned digital TV audio radio, it would be necessary to periodically rescan the available channels to find new stations.
