= Collinear antenna array =

Antenna system type

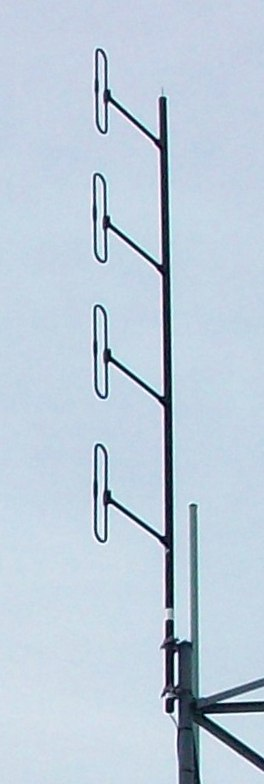
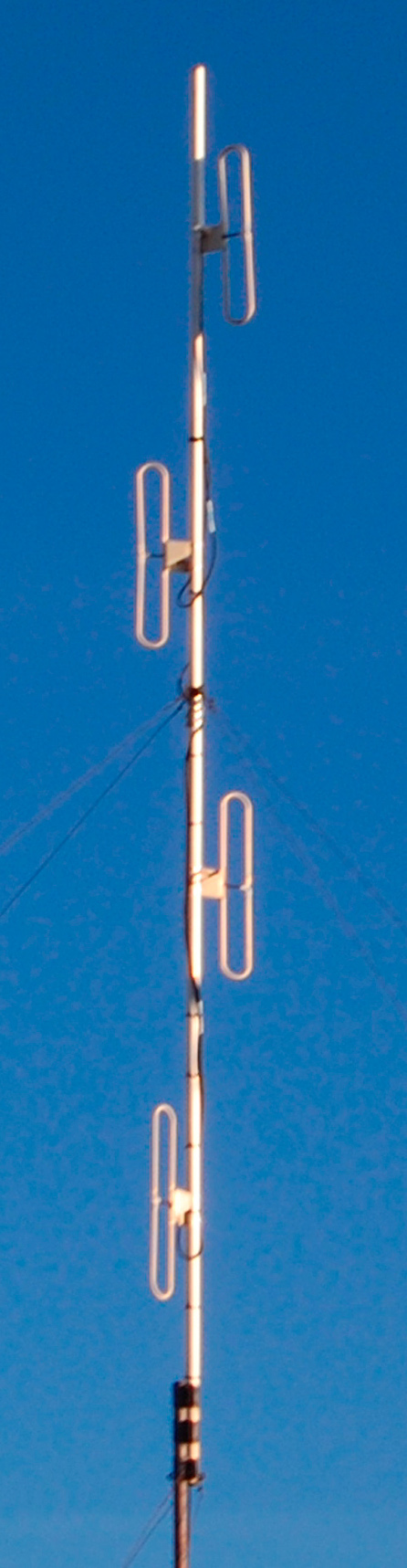
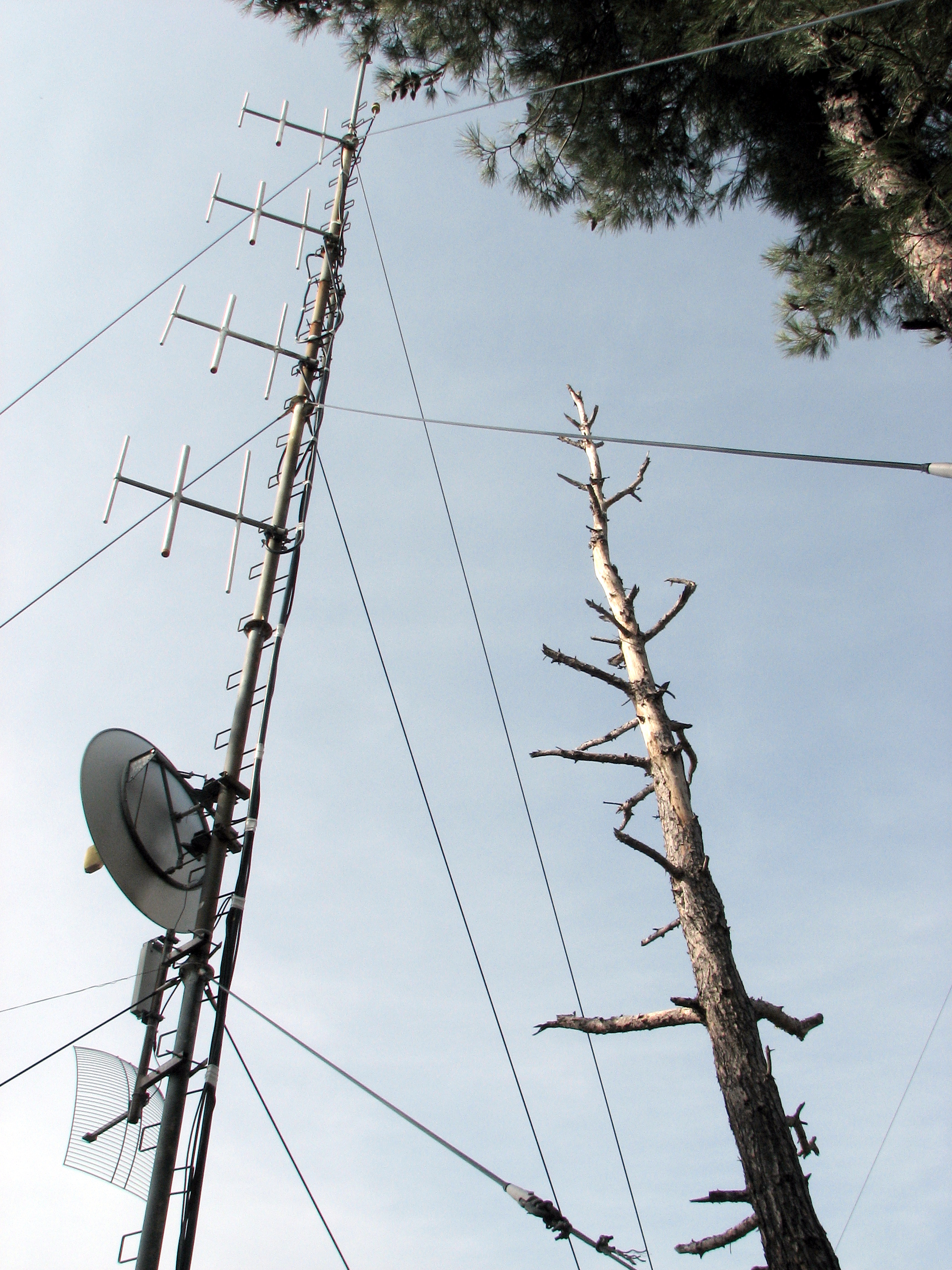
(left & center) Collinear folded dipole arrays. Often used as base station antenna for dispatcher for police, fire, ambulance, and taxi services. (right) Directional antenna consisting of 4 collinear Yagi beam antennas.

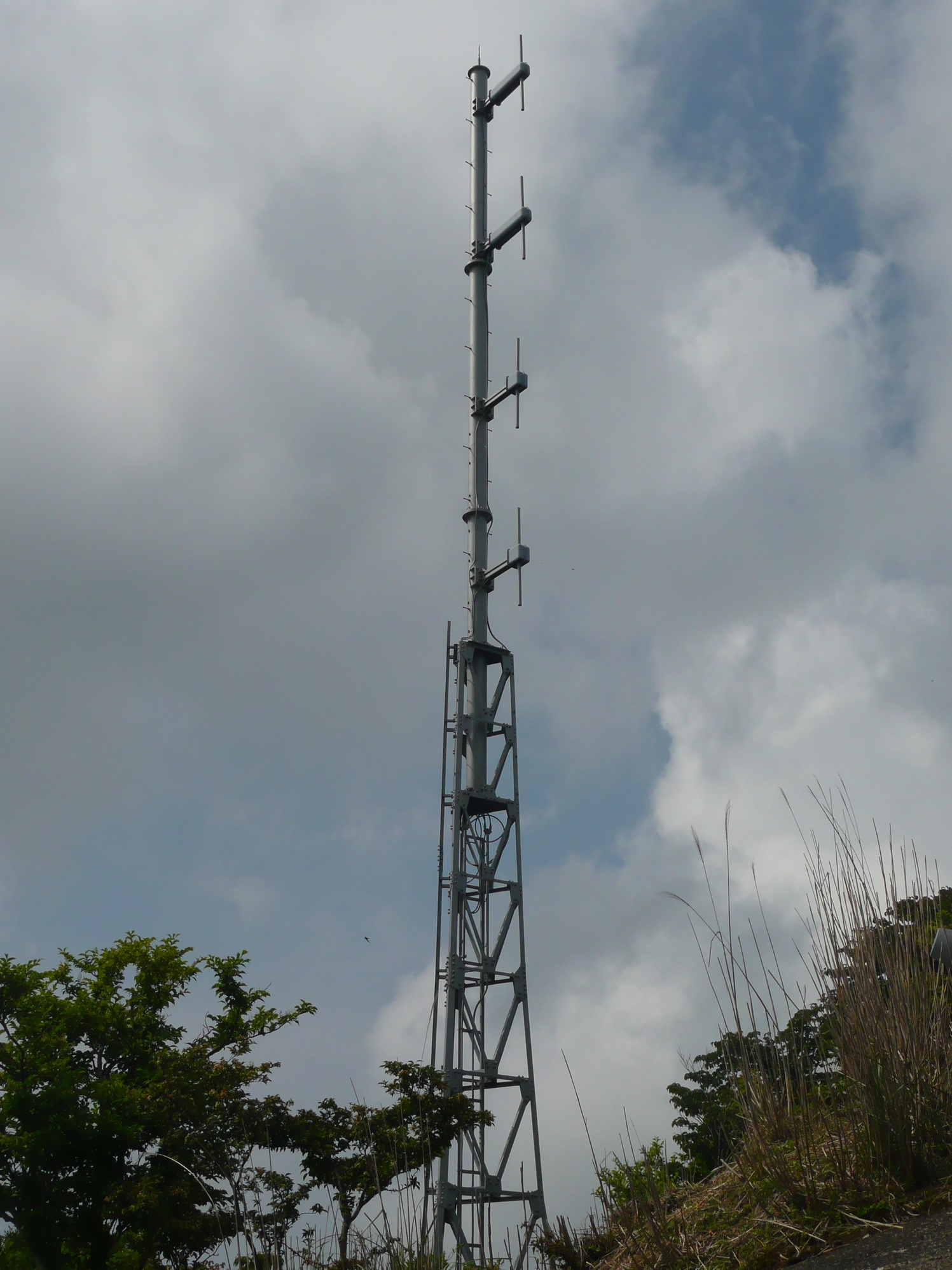
Collinear dipole array on repeater for radio station JOHG-FM on Mt. Shibisan, Kagoshima, Japan

In telecommunications, a collinear antenna array (sometimes spelled colinear antenna array) is an array of dipole or quarter-wave antennas mounted in such a manner that the corresponding elements of each antenna are parallel and collinear; that is, they are located along a common axis.

Collinear arrays are high gain omnidirectional antennas. Both dipoles and quarter-wavelength monopoles have an omnidirectional radiation pattern in free space when oriented vertically; they radiate equal radio power in all azimuthal directions perpendicular to the antenna, with the signal strength dropping to zero on the antenna axis. The purpose of stacking multiple antennas in a vertical collinear array is to increase the power radiated in horizontal directions and reduce the power radiated into the sky or down toward the earth, where it is wasted. They radiate vertically polarized radio waves. Theoretically, when stacking idealized lossless antennas in such a fashion, doubling their number will produce double the gain, with an increase of 3.01 dB. In practice, the gain realized will be below this due to imperfect radiation spread and losses.

Collinear arrays are frequently constructed as a stack of dipoles, but can also be constructed as a stack of phased quarter-wave antennas. In this configuration, the individual radiators within the array are often constructed of coaxial feedlines with the center conductor of one element being connected electrically to the shield of the one above, and so on in alternating phase for as many elements are specified by gain or overall length requirements. The final or 'top' element in the stack is a quarter-wave radiator connected directly to the center conductor of the element below it. This style of collinear antenna is usually housed in a fiberglass radome, to provide both support and environmental protection to the relatively fragile coaxial elements.

A third type of collinear array, rarely seen outside amateur radio VHF/UHF applications, uses half-wavelength monopole elements with phasing coils between each consecutive pair of elements to achieve the necessary phase shift. This style tends to be less efficient due to coil losses, but has the advantage that it can be constructed with the elements supporting themselves, doing away with the need for a protective radome.

Collinear arrays are often used as the antennas for base stations for land mobile radio systems that communicate with mobile two-way radios in vehicles, such as police, fire, ambulance, and taxi dispatchers. They are also sometimes used for broadcasting.
