= The Buddy Deane Show =

American television series

The Buddy Deane Show is an American teen dance television show, created by Zvi Shoubin, hosted by Winston "Buddy" Deane (1924–2003), and aired on WJZ-TV (Channel 13), the ABC affiliate station in Baltimore from 1957 until 1964. It is similar to Philadelphia's American Bandstand.

The Buddy Deane Show ended in January 1964 amid a dispute over adding African-American dancers to the program. According to Deane, WJZ-TV's management wanted the show integrated, but the station "did not realize that Baltimore was very much a Southern-oriented city", and the regular teen dancers said their parents would not accept it.

== Synopsis ==
Deane's dance party television show debuted on September 9, 1957, as The Buddy Deane Bandstand, after Westinghouse bought WAAM-TV and changed its call letters to WJZ-TV. For a time it was the most popular local show in the United States, airing for two and a half hours a day, six days a week. Teenagers who appeared on the show every day were known as "the Committee"; its members auditioned new dancers, set the rules of conduct and policed the dress code. Committee members included Jonas and Joanie Cash, Mike Miller, Charlie Bledsoe, Ron Osher, Mary Lou Raines, Pat(ricia) Tacey, and Cathy Schmink. Hundreds of thousands of teens learned the latest dances by watching Committee members on the show, copying their personal style, and following their life stories and interactions.

Many top acts of the day, both black and white, appeared on The Buddy Deane Show. Acts that appeared on the show first reportedly were barred from appearing on American Bandstand, but if they had been on Bandstand first they could still be on The Buddy Deane Show. The rivalry with Dick Clark meant that Deane urged all his performers not to mention American Bandstand or visits to Clark in Philadelphia. Although WJZ-TV, owned by Westinghouse Broadcasting (now CBS since January 2, 1995), was an ABC affiliate, the station "blacked out" the network broadcast of American Bandstand in Baltimore and instead broadcast the Deane program, reportedly because Bandstand showed black teenagers dancing on the show (but black and white teenagers were not allowed to dance together until the show was moved to California in 1964). The Deane program set aside every other Friday for a show featuring only black teenagers. For the rest of the time, the show's participants were all white. However, as the civil rights movement gained strength in the United States, WJZ-TV began insisting on the program having a regular lineup of racially-integrated dancers. Deane complied briefly, featuring such a lineup for a few months until protests from segregationists prompted him to have a racially-segregated lineup of dancers again, prompting protests from integrationists. Deane, who believed his program fell victim to the debate over integrated dancing, remarked, on the subject of it being incorporated on his show, that "you're in trouble if you do and in trouble if you don't." WJZ-TV denied that the debate over integration had played a role in the series' cancellation, arguing that the decision was instead brought about by changing musical tastes and declining ratings for the program. The final show aired on January 4, 1964, with "The Party's Over" as its last song.

Owing to Deane's mid-South roots and work history, he featured many performers from the ranks of country and western music (e.g., Skeeter Davis, singing "The End of the World" and Brenda Lee singing "Sweet Nothin's"), who then achieved cross-over hits among rock and roll fans. Deane also played songs that other disc jockeys, including Dick Clark, refused to present to mostly white teen TV audiences because the acts sounded "too black" (e.g. "Do You Love Me" by The Contours, or "Hide and Go Seek" by Bunker Hill). With an ear for music seasoned by many more years as a disc jockey than Clark, Deane brought to his audience a wider array of white musical acts than were seen on American Bandstand. For example, Carole King appeared on the show playing her single "It Might as Well Rain Until September", nearly a decade before she achieved popularity with her 1971 album Tapestry. Deane also presented British artist Helen Shapiro, who sang her Baltimore hit "Tell Me What He Said" at about the time that she was touring England with The Beatles as one of her supporting acts.

Deane organized and disc-jockeyed dances in public venues across the WJZ-TV broadcast area, including much of central Maryland, Delaware, and southern Pennsylvania where tens of thousands of teenagers were exposed to live recording artists and TV personalities. In several instances, the show went on location to the Milford Mill swim club on the westside of suburban Baltimore County. Almost all dancers wore swim wear and beach attire, with music provided by WJZ-TV. One show was even broadcast from a local farm in Westminster, Maryland. Participants dressed in "country" style and danced to country and western music as well as pop. Several local art contests were held on the show, with viewers submitting their own art work. Deane held dances at various Maryland American Legion posts and National Guard armories, which were not taped or broadcast on television.

"Buddy" Deane was a broadcaster for more than 50 years, beginning his career in Little Rock, Arkansas, moving to the Memphis, Tennessee market, and moving to Baltimore, where he worked at WITH radio. He was one of the early disc jockeys in the area to regularly feature rock and roll. Deane died in Pine Bluff, Arkansas on July 16, 2003 after suffering a stroke. He was 78.

== Legacy ==
Dick Clark patterned his ABC-TV show Where the Action Is after local remotes done by Deane in Maryland.

The racial integration of a take-off of the show, dubbed The Corny Collins Show, provides the backdrop to the 1988 John Waters film Hairspray. The film spawned a 2002 Broadway musical adaptation starring Harvey Fierstein and Marissa Jaret Winokur, and a 2007 film adaptation of the musical starring John Travolta and Nikki Blonsky. Waters appeared on the show with his friend Mary Vivian Pearce but they were removed for dancing the "dirty boogie". Waters later gave Deane a cameo in the film as a TV reporter who tried to interview the governor who was besieged by integration protesters.

As with many other local TV shows, little footage of the show is known to have survived. When Barry Levinson, another Baltimore native, requested video from the show for his film Diner, the station told him it had no footage.
