= CCIR System C =

625-line analog television transmission format

CCIR System C (originally known as the Belgian 625-line system) is an analog broadcast television system used between 1953 and 1978 in Belgium, Italy, Netherlands, and Luxembourg. Used on VHF only.

== Specifications ==
Some of the important specifications for System C are listed below:

- Frame rate: 25 Hz
- Interlace: 2/1
- Field rate: 50 Hz
- Lines/frame: 625
- Line rate: 15.625 kHz
- Visual bandwidth: 5 MHz
- Vision modulation: Positive
- Preemphasis: 50 μs
- Sound modulation: AM
- Sound offset: +5.5 MHz
- Channel bandwidth: 7 MHz
- Assumed display device gamma: 2.0

Plan showing VHF frequency ranges for ITU Systems

Television channels were arranged as follows:

System C 625 lines
Channel	Video carrier (MHz)	Audio carrier (MHz)
1	41.25	46.75
1A	42.25	47.75
2	48.25	53.75
2A	49.75	55.25
3	55.25	60.75
4	62.25	67.75
4A	82.25	87.75
5	175.25	180.75
6	182.25	187.75
7	189.25	194.75
8	196.25	201.75
9	203.25	208.75
10	210.25	215.75
11	217.25	222.75
12	224.25	229.75

== See also ==
- CCIR System B
- CCIR System L
- Broadcast television systems
- Television transmitter
- Transposer
