= CCIR System N =

625-line analog television transmission format

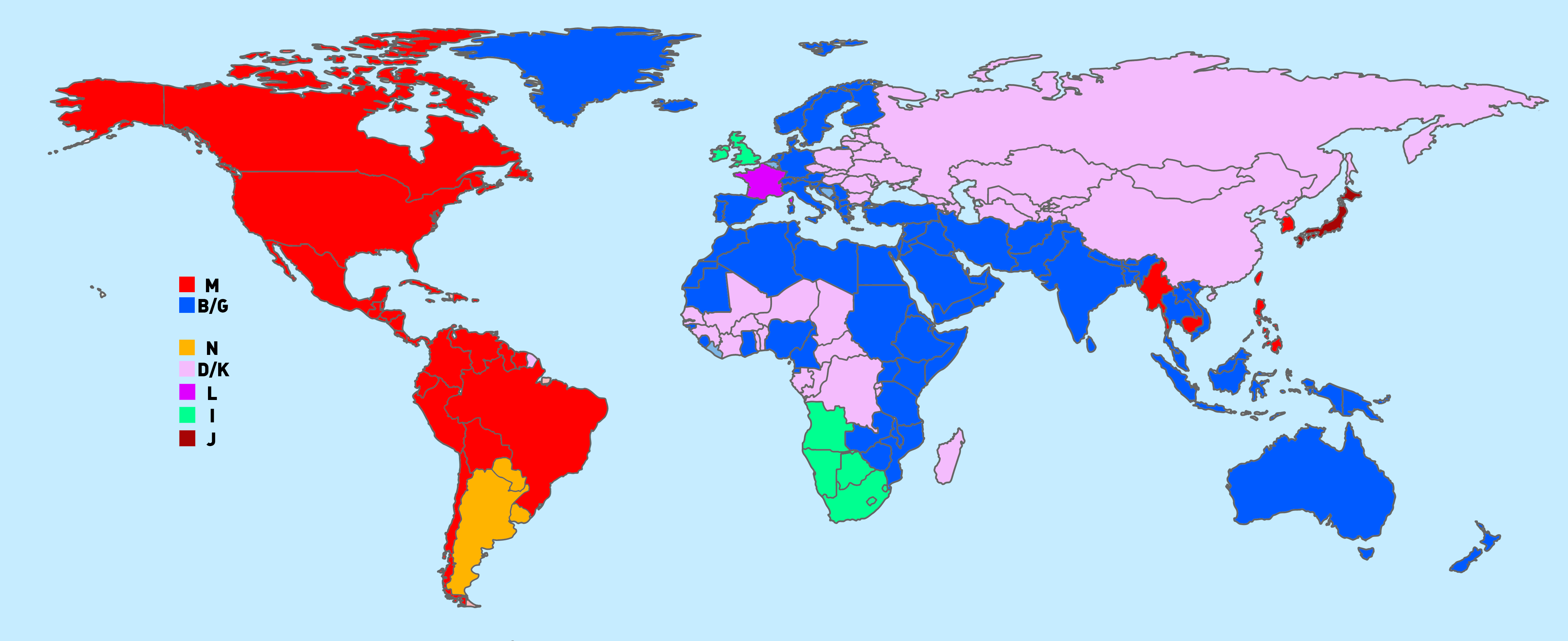
Analog TV systems global map, with System N in orange.

CCIR System N is an analog broadcast television system introduced in 1951 and adopted by Argentina, Paraguay, and Uruguay, paired with the PAL color system (PAL-N) since 1980.

It employs the 625 line/50 field per second waveform of CCIR Systems B/G, D/K, and I, but on a 6 MHz channel with a chrominance subcarrier frequency of 3.582056 MHz (similar to NTSC).

== Specifications ==
The general System N specifications are listed below:

Plan showing VHF frequency ranges for ITU Systems

- Frame rate: 25 Hz
- Interlace: 2/1
- Field rate: 50 Hz
- Lines/frame: 625
- Line rate: 15.625 kHz
- Visual bandwidth: 4.2 MHz
- Vision modulation: Negative
- Preemphasis: 75 μs
- Sound modulation: FM
- Sound offset: +4.5 MHz
- Channel bandwidth: 6 MHz

== See also ==
- PAL
- PAL-N
- Broadcast television systems
- Multichannel Television Sound
- Pan-American television frequencies
