= Zweikanalton =

German 2-channel sound system

Digital on-screen graphic displayed at the beginning of Zweikanalton programmes on ORF 1

Zweikanalton ("two-channel sound"), or A2 Stereo, is an analog television stereo sound and bilingual audio transmission system used in Germany, Austria, Australia, Switzerland, Netherlands, Malaysia, Indonesia, Serbia, Croatia, Turkey, Poland and some other countries that use or used CCIR systems. South Korea utilized a modified version of Zweikanalton for the NTSC analog television standard.

Zweikanalton relies on two separate FM carriers.

This offers a relatively high separation between the channels (compared to a subcarrier-based multiplexing system) and can thus be used for bilingual broadcasts as well as stereo. Unlike the competing NICAM standard, Zweikanalton is an analog system.

Zweikanalton can be adapted to any existing analogue television system, and modern PAL or SECAM television receivers generally include a sound detector IC that can decode both Zweikanalton and NICAM.

== Technical details ==
A 2nd FM sound carrier containing a second sound channel is transmitted at a frequency 242 kHz higher than the default FM sound carrier, and contains a 54.6875 kHz pilot tone to indicate whether the broadcast is mono, stereo or bilingual.

This pilot tone is 50% amplitude-modulated with 117.5 Hz for stereo or 274.1 Hz for bilingual. The absence of this carrier indicates normal mono sound.

The Zweikanalton FM carrier has to be 20 dB weaker than video carrier and 7 dB weaker than default FM sound carrier, to avoid video interference issues.

Zweikanalton can carry either a completely separate audio program, or can be used for stereo sound transmission. In the latter case, the first FM carrier carries (L+R) for compatibility, while the second carrier carries R (not L-R.) After combining the two channels, this method improves the signal-to-noise ratio by reducing the correlated noise between the channels.

Carrier frequencies are chosen so that they cause minimal interference to the picture. The difference between the two sound carriers is 15.5 times the line frequency (15.5 x 15625 Hz = 242187.5 Hz) which, being an odd multiple of half line frequency, reduces the visibility of intermodulation products between the two carriers. The pilot tone frequency is 3.5 times line frequency (54687.5 Hz). The modulated tone frequency is 117.5 Hz for stereo transmission and 274.1 Hz for bilingual transmission. Absence of this tone is interpreted as a monaural transmission.

Zweikanalton operating modes
| Mode | Standard sound carrier | | 2nd sound carrier | | | | Pilot tone in 2nd carrier |
| Mode | BG 5.5 MHz | DK 6.5 MHz | BG 5.742 MHz | DK^{a} 6.258 MHz | DK^{a} 6.742 MHz | DK^{a} 5.742^{b} MHz | Pilot tone in 2nd carrier |
|---|---|---|---|---|---|---|---|
| Mono | mono | | carrier is absent | | | | none |
| Stereo | mix of left & right (L+R) | | right audio channel (R) | | | | 54.6875 kHz 50% AM with 117.5 Hz |
| Bilingual | 1st language | | 2nd language | | | | 54.6875 kHz 50% AM with 274.1 Hz |

a.The second sound carrier frequency of DK systems varies from country, and sometimes manufacturers divide them into DK1/DK2/DK3 systems.
b.The video bandwidth is reduced.

== System M variant ==
There is a modified version of Zweikanalton used in South Korea, compatible with the NTSC System M standard of TV transmission. In this case the second FM carrier is 14.25 times the line frequency, or about 224 kHz, above the first carrier; pre-emphasis is 75 microseconds; the stereo pilot tone frequency is 149.9 Hz; the bilingual pilot tone frequency is 276 Hz; and the second channel carries L-R (not R).

== History ==
Zweikanalton was developed by the Institut für Rundfunktechnik (IRT) in Munich during the 1970s, and was first introduced on the German national television channel ZDF on 13 September 1981. The German public broadcaster ARD subsequently introduced Zweikanalton on its Das Erste channel on 29 August 1985 in honour of the 1985 edition of the Internationale Funkausstellung Berlin (IFA). West Germany thus became the first country in Europe to use multiplexed sound on its television channels.

In Malaysia, TV3 used Zweikanalton on its UHF analogue transmission frequency (Channel 29), while NICAM was instead used on its VHF analogue transmission frequency (Channel 12).

In Indonesia, the first TV station to use Zweikanalton was SCTV, which utilized from its start of broadcasting in 1990. Later, Zweikanalton was abandoned by national networks in favor of NICAM but at least there was one local television station that still used Zweikanalton.

In Serbia, NTV Studio B used Zweikanalton from its first start of broadcasting in March 1990, and Reopening on 16 November 1990 on its all channels (UHF 32, 40, 49, 51 and 53) for stereo transmission. In 1994 it stopped to use Zweikanalton because of video degradation caused by intermodulation products. In 2000s this technology was successfully used by Fox televizija/Prva, Serbian Television RTS and many cable operators, also for stereo transmission only.

In Croatia, Zweikanalton was used by Croatian Television HRT from 1990s on all three channels (HTV1, HTV2, and HTV3), also for stereo transmission only.

All the mentioned TV stations from Serbia and Croatia produced all TV shows in stereo, and broadcast permanently in stereo mode. They broadcast every mono source by simply creating two identical - left and right channels from the mono input, similar to the most radio stations.

In Austria, Zweikanalton was introduced on 1 September 1990 on public television ORF for both bilingual and stereo broadcasting. It was used for both purposes until analogue television switch-off.

In Turkey, the private TV channel Star TV (originally Magic Box Star 1) was the pioneer in Turkey to utilise the Zweikanalton system for both dual audio and stereo sound broadcasting since its start of terrestrial broadcasting in September 1992. This allowed viewers to watch Hollywood series and movies such as The A-Team, MacGyver or Miami Vice in either the original English or with Turkish dubbing. This audio system became quickly the standard for most major private national television stations to offer stereo and bilingual features, like Show TV, Kanal D, ATV, Cine5 and other private channels. The state broadcaster TRT implemented the same Zweikanalton technology later in the 1990s. Turkey was one more European country with Zweikanalton as standard for multiplex sound in analogue terrestrial and cable television broadcasting systems.

In Poland, cable TV providers standardised in 1990s both Zweikanalton and British stereo TV-system called NICAM for simultaneous transmission on TV channels. They transmitted main (mono/L+R) audio signal on 6,5 MHz, Zweikanalton other than usually (5,742 MHz) they transmitted on 6,258 MHz. The NICAM signal was transmitted on 5,85 MHz.

As a result of the analogue television switch-off in most countries which used Zweikanalton, Zweikanalton is now considered obsolete and has been replaced with MPEG-2 and/or MPEG-4 for countries that have converted to DVB-T/DVB-T2 (Europe and Asia-Pacific), and Dolby Digital AC-3 on ATSC in South Korea.

== Other names ==
Zweikanalton is known by a variety of names worldwide. Most commonly used names are Zweiton, German Stereo, A2 Stereo, Dual FM Stereo, West German Stereo, Zwei Träger System, Two Carrier and IGR Stereo.

== See also ==
- Multichannel Television Sound (3 additional audio channels on 4.5 MHz audio carriers)
- NICAM
- EIAJ MTS
