= CCIR System I =

625-line analogue TV transmission format

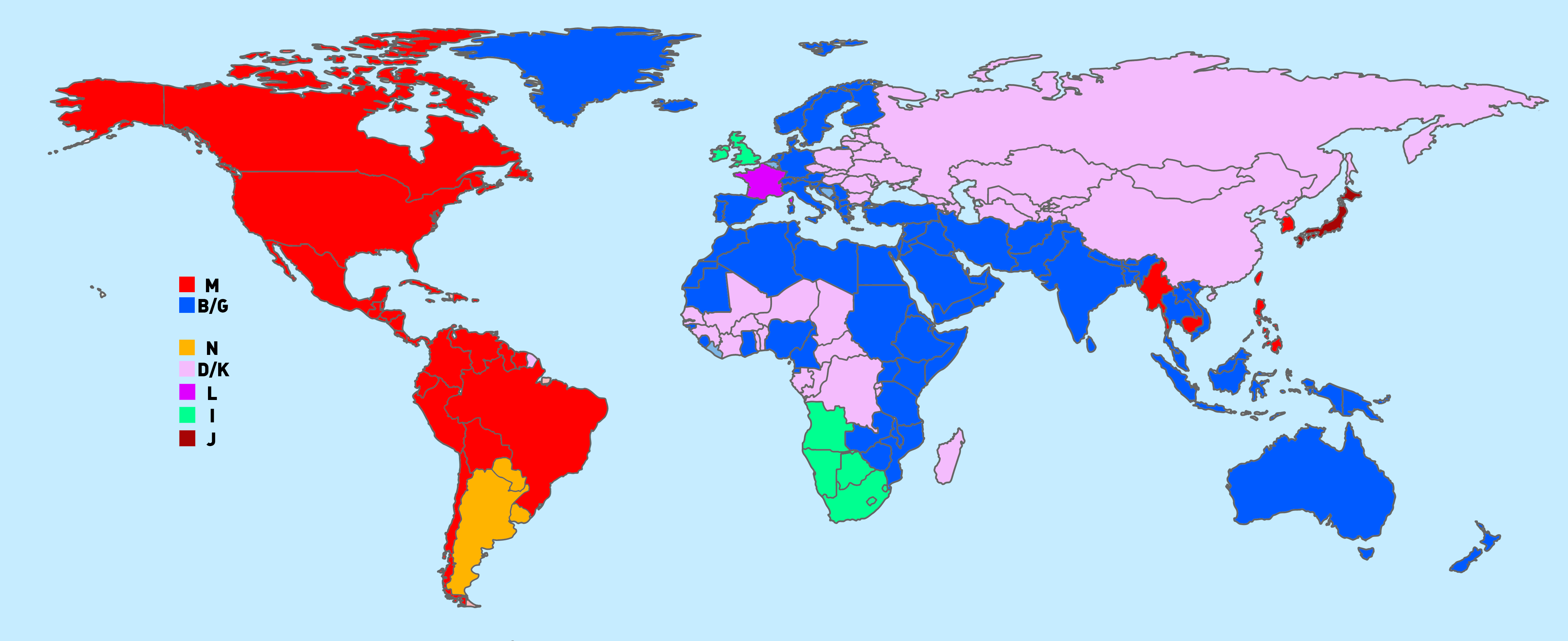
Analog TV systems global map, with System I in light green.

CCIR System I is an analogue broadcast television system. It was first used in Ireland starting in December 1961 as the 625-line broadcasting standard to be used on VHF Band I and Band III, sharing Band III with 405-line System A signals radiated in the north and east of the country. Ireland slowly extended its use of System I onto the UHF bands.

The UK started its own 625-line television service in 1964 also using System I, but on UHF only – the UK has never used VHF for 625-line television except for some cable relay distribution systems.

Since then, System I has been adopted for use by Hong Kong, Macau, the Falkland Islands, South Africa, Angola, Botswana, Lesotho, Namibia, Tanzania, Saint Helena, and Pitcairn Islands.

As of late 2012, analogue television is no longer transmitted in either the UK or Ireland. South Africa is still broadcasting in System I, but have plans to end the service at any time.

== Specifications ==
Some of the important specs are listed below:

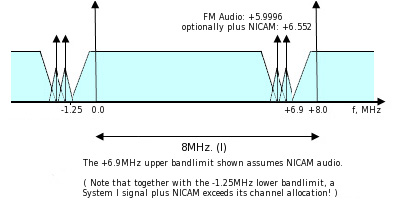
Channel spacing for CCIR television System I (VHF and UHF Bands) The separation between the audio and video carriers is 5.9996 MHz.

- Frame rate: 25 Hz
- Interlace: 2/1
- Field rate: 50 Hz
- Lines/frame: 625
- Line rate: 15.625 kHz
- Visual bandwidth: 5.5 MHz
- Vision modulation: AC3 negative
- Preemphasis: 50 μs
- Sound modulation: F3
- Sound offset: 5.9996 MHz
- Channel bandwidth: 8 MHz

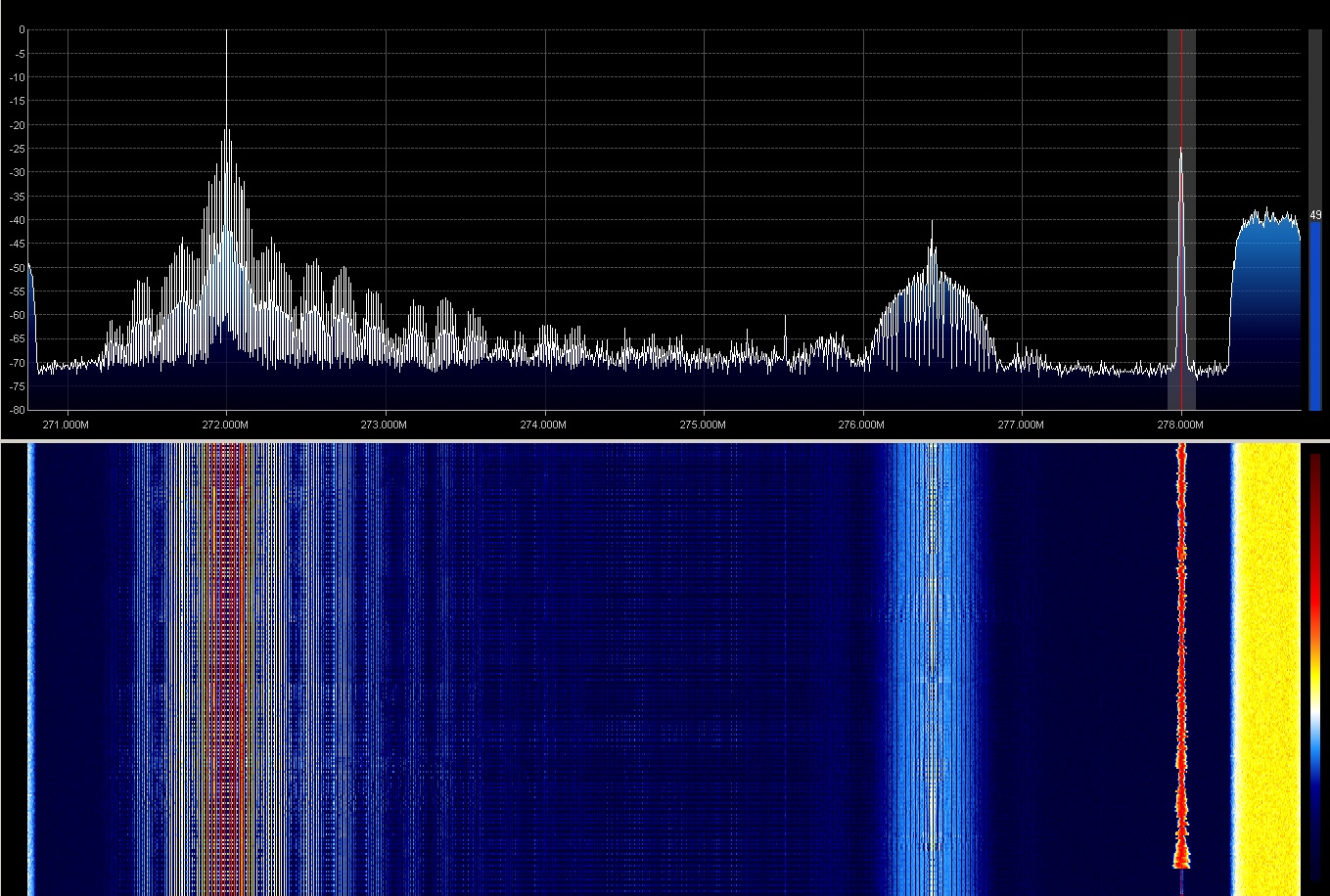
RF Spectrogram and Waterfall of an actual PAL-I transmission screenshot captured with SDRSharp software and an Airspy SDR Luma carrier @ 272 MHz, Chroma carrier @ 276.43361875 MHz, FM audio @ 278 MHz, NICAM audio @ 278.5 MHz

A frame is the total picture. The frame rate is the number of pictures displayed in one second. But each frame is actually scanned twice interleaving odd and even lines. Each scan is known as a field (odd and even fields.) So field rate is twice the frame rate. In each frame there are 625 lines (or 312.5 lines in a field.) So line rate (line frequency) is 625 times the frame frequency or 625×25=15625 Hz.

The total RF bandwidth of System I (as originally designed with its single FM audio subcarrier) was about 7.4 MHz, allowing System I signals to be transmitted in 8.0 MHz wide channels with an ample 600 kHz guard zone between channels.

In specs, sometimes, other parameters such as vestigial sideband characteristics and gamma of display device are also given.

=== Colour TV ===
System I has only been used with the PAL colour systems, but it would have been technically possible to use SECAM or a 625-line variant of the NTSC color system. However, apart from possible technical tests in the 1960s, this has never been done officially.

When used with PAL, the colour subcarrier is 4.43361875 MHz and the sidebands of the PAL signal have to be truncated on the high-frequency side at +1.066 MHz (matching the rolloff of the luminance signal at +5.5 MHz). On the low-frequency side, the full 1.3 MHz sideband width is radiated. (This behaviour would cause some U/V crosstalk in the NTSC system, but delay-line PAL hides such artefacts.)

Additionally, to minimise beat-patterns between the chrominance subcarrier and the sound subcarrier, when PAL is used with System I, the sound subcarrier is moved slightly off the originally-specified 6.0 MHz to 5.9996 MHz. This is such a slight frequency shift that no alterations needed to be made to existing System I television sets when the change was made.

No colour encoding system has any effect on the bandwidth of system I as a whole.

=== Improved audio ===
Enhancements have been made to the specification of System I's audio capabilities over the years. Starting in the late 1980s and early 1990s it became possible to add a digital signal carrying NICAM sound. This extension to audio capability has completely eaten the guard band between channels, indeed there would be a small amount of analogue-digital crosstalk between the NICAM signal of a transmitter on channel N and the vestigial sideband of a transmission on channel N+1. Good channel planning means that under normal situations no ill effects are seen or heard.

The NICAM system used with System I adds a 700–kHz-wide digital signal, and needs to be placed at least 552 kHz from the audio subcarrier.

== Transmission channels ==
Plan showing VHF frequency ranges for ITU Systems

=== Ireland from 1962 ===
Channel	Channel limits (MHz)	Vision carrier frequency (MHz)	Main audio carrier frequency (MHz)
EA	44.50 – 52.50	45.75	51.75
EB	52.50 – 60.50	53.75	59.75
EC	60.50 – 68.50	61.75	67.75

VHF Band 1 was already discontinued for TV broadcasting well before Ireland's digital switchover.

Channel	Channel limits (MHz)	Vision carrier frequency (MHz)	Main audio carrier frequency (MHz)
ED	174.00 – 182.00	175.25	181.25
EE	182.00 – 190.00	183.25	189.25
EF	190.00 – 198.00	191.25	197.25
EG	198.00 – 206.00	199.25	205.25
EH	206.00 – 214.00	207.25	213.25
EI	214.00 – 222.00	215.25	221.25
EJ ♥	222.00 – 230.00	223.25	229.25

♥ No longer used for TV broadcasting.

UHF takeup in Ireland was slower than in the UK. A written answer in the Dáil Éireann (Irish parliament) shows that even by mid-1988 Ireland was transmitting on UHF from only four main transmitters and 11 relays.

=== United Kingdom from 1964 ===
Channel	Channel limits (MHz)	Vision carrier frequency (MHz)	Main audio carrier frequency (MHz)
21	470.0 – 478.0	471.25	477.25
22	478.0 – 486.0	479.25	485.25
23	486.0 – 494.0	487.25	493.25
24	494.0 – 502.0	495.25	501.25
25	502.0 – 510.0	503.25	509.25
26	510.0 – 518.0	511.25	517.25
27	518.0 – 526.0	519.25	525.25
28	526.0 – 534.0	527.25	533.25
29	534.0 – 542.0	535.25	541.25
30	542.0 – 550.0	543.25	549.25
31	550.0 – 558.0	551.25	557.25
32	558.0 – 566.0	559.25	565.25
33	566.0 – 574.0	567.25	573.25
34	574.0 – 582.0	575.25	581.25
35 †	582.0 – 590.0	583.25	589.25
36 †	590.0 – 598.0	591.25	597.25
37 †	598.0 – 606.0	599.25	605.25
38 †	606.0 – 614.0	607.25	613.25
39	614.0 – 622.0	615.25	621.25
40	622.0 – 630.0	623.25	629.25
41	630.0 – 638.0	631.25	637.25
42	638.0 – 646.0	639.25	645.25
43	646.0 – 654.0	647.25	653.25
44	654.0 – 662.0	655.25	661.25
45	662.0 – 670.0	663.25	669.25
46	670.0 – 678.0	671.25	677.25
47	678.0 – 686.0	679.25	685.25
48	686.0 – 694.0	687.25	693.25
49	694.0 – 702.0	695.25	701.25
50	702.0 – 710.0	703.25	709.25
51	710.0 – 718.0	711.25	717.25
52	718.0 – 726.0	719.25	725.25
53	726.0 – 734.0	727.25	733.25
54	734.0 – 742.0	735.25	741.25
55	742.0 – 750.0	743.25	749.25
56	750.0 – 758.0	751.25	757.25
57	758.0 – 766.0	759.25	765.25
58	766.0 – 774.0	767.25	773.25
59	774.0 – 782.0	775.25	781.25
60	782.0 – 790.0	783.25	789.25
61	790.0 – 798.0	791.25	797.25
62	798.0 – 806.0	799.25	805.25
63	806.0 – 814.0	807.25	813.25
64	814.0 – 822.0	815.25	821.25
65	822.0 – 830.0	823.25	829.25
66	830.0 – 838.0	831.25	837.25
67	838.0 – 846.0	839.25	845.25
68	846.0 – 854.0	847.25	853.25
69 §	854.0 – 862.0	855.25	861.25

† Channels 35 to 37, between UHF Band IV and Band V, were originally reserved for radio astronomy. However, from 1997 until the finish of analogue TV in the UK in 2012, the UK used these channels for analogue broadcasts of Channel 5.

§ Channel 69 was allocated, but never used in the UK.

== See also ==
- Broadcast television systems
- Television transmitter
- Transposer
