= CCIR System A =

405-line analog television transmission format

CCIR System A was the 405-line analog broadcast television system adopted in the UK and Ireland. System A service started in 1936 and was discontinued in 1982 in Ireland and 1985 in Britain.

== Specifications ==
Channel spacing for CCIR television System A (VHF Bands) The separation between the audio and video carriers is −3.5 MHz.

Some of the important specs are listed below:

- Frame rate: 25 Hz
- Interlace: 2/1
- Field rate: 50 Hz
- Lines per frame: 405
- Line rate: 10.125 kHz
- Visual bandwidth: 3 MHz
- Vision modulation: AC3 positive
- Preemphasis: none
- Sound modulation: A3
- Sound offset: -3.5 MHz
- Channel bandwidth: 5 MHz

A frame is the total picture. The frame rate is the number of pictures displayed in one second. But each frame is actually scanned twice interleaving odd and even lines. Each scan is known as a field (odd and even fields.) So field rate is twice the frame rate. In each frame there are 405 lines (or 202.5 lines in a field.) So the line rate (line frequency) is 405 times the frame frequency or 405×25=10,125 Hz.

The video bandwidth was 3.0 MHz. The video signal modulates the carrier by amplitude modulation, but a portion of the upper sideband is suppressed. This technique is known as vestigial sideband modulation (AC3). The polarity of modulation is positive, meaning that an increase in the instantaneous brightness of the video signal results in an increase in RF power and vice versa. Specifically, the sync pulses (being "blacker than black") result in minimum power (possibly zero power) from the vision transmitter.

The audio signal was modulated by amplitude modulation.

The separation between the audio AM carrier and the video carrier is −3.5 MHz.

The total RF bandwidth of System A was 4.26 MHz, allowing System A to be transmitted in the 5.0 MHz wide channels specified for television in the British VHF bands with an ample 740 kHz guard zone between channels.

In specifications, sometimes, other parameters such as vestigial sideband characteristics and gamma of display device are also given.

=== Colour TV ===
System A has variously been tested with the NTSC, PAL, and SECAM colour systems. However, apart from out-of-hours technical tests in the 1950s and 1960s, colour was never transmitted officially on System A.

Colour tests were first radiated from Alexandra Palace from 7 October 1954. When testing with NTSC between November 1956 and April 1958, the colour subcarrier was 2.6578125 MHz with a 'Q' bandwidth of 340 kHz (matching the rolloff of the luminance signal at +3.0 MHz). On the low-frequency side, a full 1.0 MHz single-sideband of the 'I' signal was radiated.

When testing with PAL, the colour subcarrier was 2.66034375 MHz and the sidebands of the PAL signal had to be truncated on the high-frequency side at +330 kHz (matching the rolloff of the luminance signal at +3.0 MHz). On the low-frequency side, a full 1.0 MHz sideband was radiated. (This behaviour would cause massive U/V crosstalk in the NTSC system, but delay-line PAL hides such artefacts.)

When used with SECAM, the FM carrier was nominally 2.66 MHz with a deviation of ±250 kHz.

None of the above colour encoding systems had any effect on the bandwidth of system A as a whole.

=== Audio ===
No changes were made to the audio specification over the 49 years that the 405-line system was in use.

== Transmission channels ==
Plan showing VHF frequency ranges for ITU Systems

System A was the first formal broadcasting standard in the world. A European 41–68 MHz Band I television allocation was agreed at the 1947 ITU (International Telecommunication Union) conference in 1947, effectively "grandfathering in" the VHF allocation that has been used in Britain since 1936.

=== United Kingdom: 1936 – 1985, Ireland 1961 – 1982 ===
Channel	Channel limits (MHz)	Vision carrier frequency (MHz)	Audio carrier frequency (MHz)
B1 †	41.25 – 46.25	45.00	41.50
B2	48.00 – 53.00	51.75	48.25
B3	53.00 – 58.00	56.75	53.25
B4	58.00 – 63.00	61.75	58.25
B5	63.00 – 68.00	66.75	63.25

† Channel limits of the original transmitter at Alexandra Palace in London were 41.25 – 48.00 DSB from 1936 to 1956. Every other transmitter on channel B1 used VSB to save bandwidth and transmission power.

Channel	Channel limits (MHz)	Vision carrier frequency (MHz)	Audio carrier frequency (MHz)
B6	176.00 – 181.00	179.75	176.25
B7	181.00 – 186.00	184.75	181.25
B8	186.00 – 191.00	189.75	186.25
B9	191.00 – 196.00	194.75	191.25
B10	196.00 – 201.00	199.75	196.25
B11	201.00 – 206.00	204.75	201.25
B12	206.00 – 211.00	209.75	206.25
B13	211.00 – 216.00	214.75	211.25
B14 §	216.00 – 221.00	219.75	216.25

§ Allocated, but never used.

== See also ==
- Broadcast television systems
- Television transmitter
- Transposer
