= CCIR System L =

625-line analog television transmission format

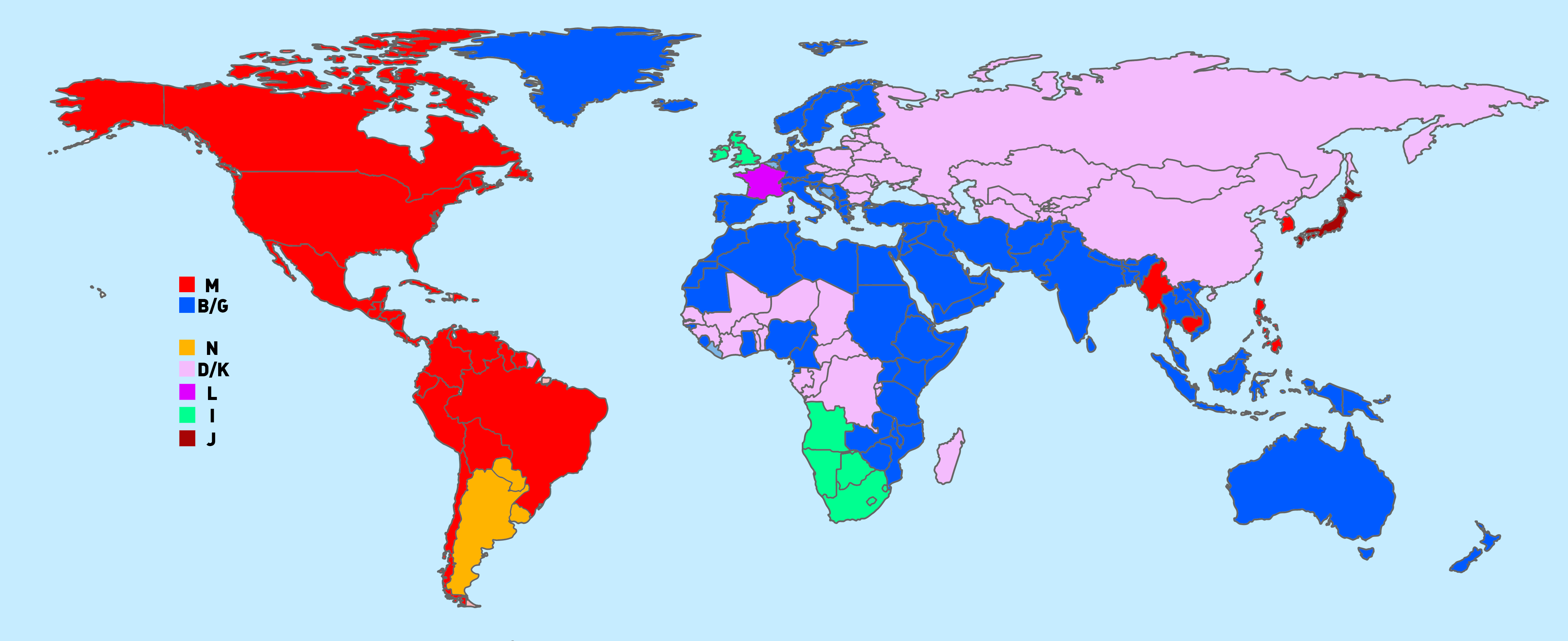
Analog TV systems global map, with System L in magenta.

CCIR System L is an analog broadcast television system used in France, Luxembourg, Monaco, and Chausey. It was the last system to use positive video modulation and AM sound.

Initially adopted in 1963 for second national black and white public channel and officially associated with the SECAM color system (SECAM-L) in 1967, it was discontinued in 2011, when France transitioned to Digital Video Broadcasting.

== Specifications ==
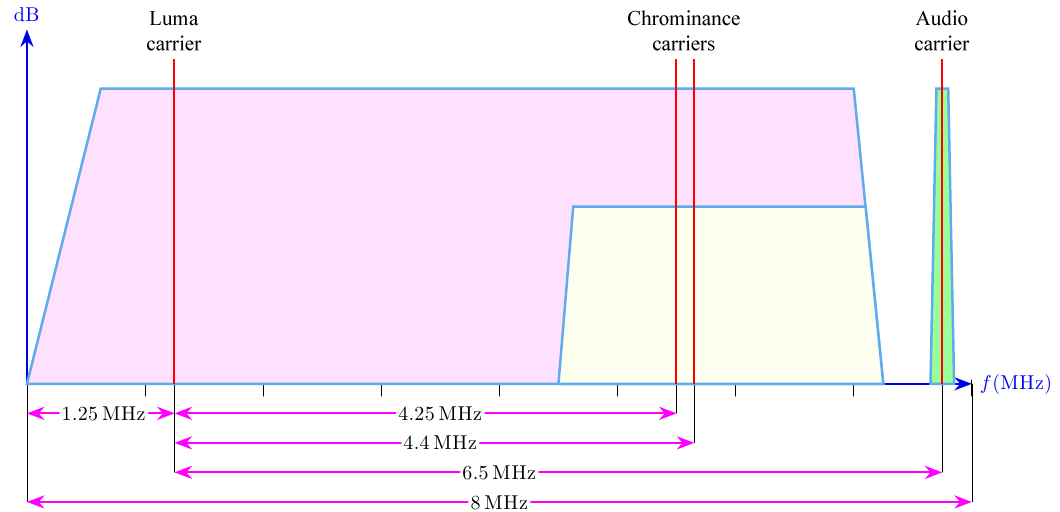
Spectrum of a SECAM-L color television signal

The main System L specifications are listed below:

- Frame rate: 25 Hz
- Interlace: 2/1
- Field rate: 50 Hz
- Lines/frame: 625
- Line rate: 15.625 kHz
- Visual bandwidth: 6 MHz
- Vision modulation: Positive
- Preemphasis: 50 μs
- Sound modulation: AM
- Sound offset: -6.5 MHz
- Channel bandwidth: 8 MHz

Plan showing VHF frequency ranges for ITU Systems

Television channels were arranged as follows:

System L VHF channels
Channel	Video carrier (MHz)	Audio carrier (MHz)
1	47.75	41.25
2	55.75	49.25
3	60.50	54.00
4	63.75	57.25
5	176.00	182.50
6	184.00	190.50
7	192.00	198.50
8	200.00	206.50
9	208.00	214.50
10	216.00	222.50

System L UHF channels
Channel	Video carrier (MHz)	Audio carrier (MHz)
21	471.25	477.75
22	479.25	485.75
23	487.25	493.75
24	495.25	501.75
25	503.25	509.75
26	511.25	517.75
27	519.25	525.75
28	527.25	533.75
29	535.25	541.75
30	543.25	549.75
31	551.25	557.75
32	559.25	565.75
33	567.25	573.75
34	575.25	581.75
35	583.25	589.75
36	591.25	597.75
37	599.25	605.75
38	607.25	613.75
39	615.25	621.75
40	623.25	629.75
41	631.25	637.75
42	639.25	645.75
43	647.25	653.75
44	655.25	661.75
45	663.25	669.75
46	671.25	677.75
47	679.25	685.75
48	687.25	693.75
49	695.25	701.75
50	703.25	709.75
51	711.25	717.75
52	719.25	725.75
53	727.25	733.75
54	735.25	741.75
55	743.25	749.75
56	751.25	757.75
57	759.25	765.75
58	767.25	773.75
59	775.25	781.75
60	783.25	789.75
61	791.25	797.75
62	799.25	805.75
63	807.25	813.75
64	815.25	821.75
65	823.25	829.75
66	831.25	837.75
67	839.25	845.75
68	847.25	853.75
69	855.25	861.75

== See also ==
- Broadcast television systems
- Television transmitter
- Transposer
