= CCIR System G =

625-line analog television transmission format

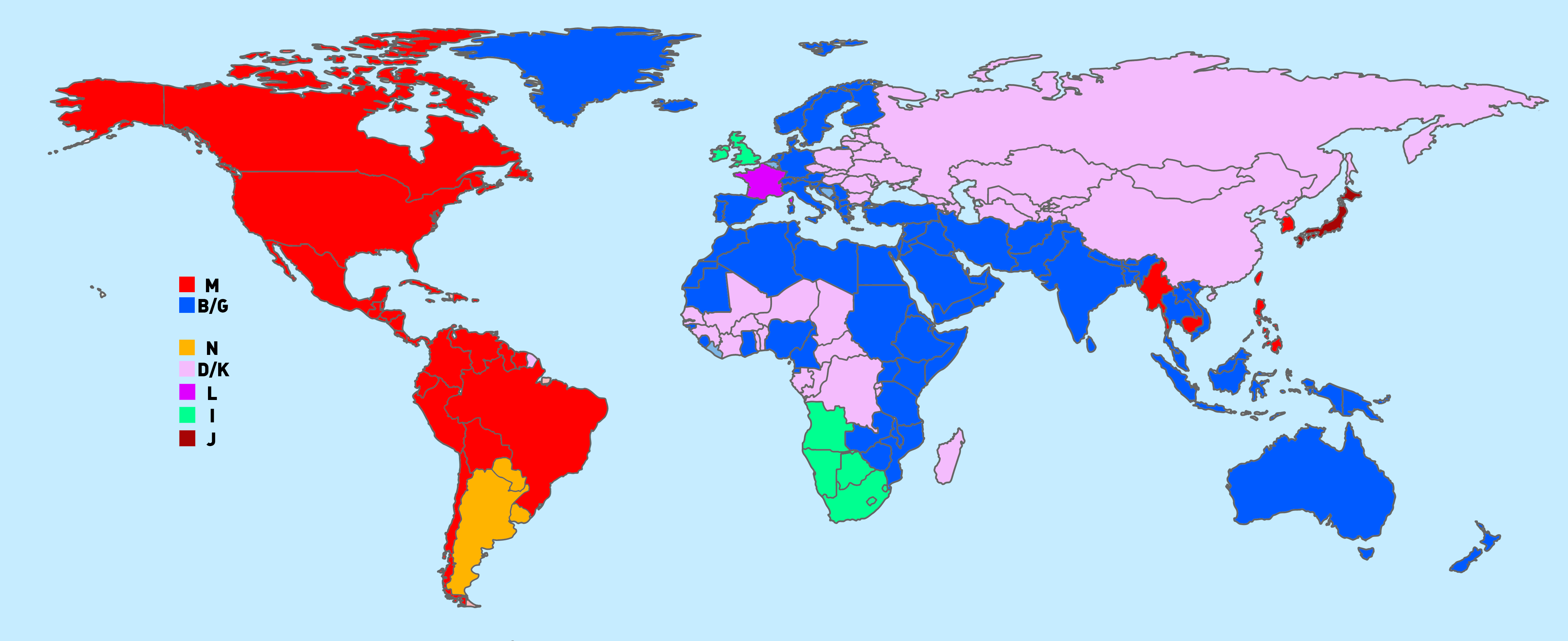
Analog TV systems global map, with System G in blue.

CCIR System G, also known as the "Gerber Standard", is an analog broadcast television system used in sixty countries around the world for UHF channels. System G is generally associated with System B for VHF.

Plan showing VHF frequency ranges for ITU Systems

At a CCIR Geneva meeting in July 1950, Dr. Gerber (a Swiss engineer), proposed a modified 625-lines system with a 7 MHz channel bandwidth (based on work by Telefunken and Walter Bruch). Known as the "Gerber Standard", it was initially approved for VHF broadcasts, and eventually adapted for UHF.

Usually paired with PAL colour, it was also used with SECAM in Egypt, Iran, and Saudi Arabia.

== Specifications ==
Some of the important specs are listed below:

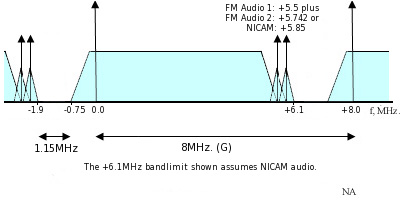
Channel spacing for CCIR television System G (UHF Bands) The separation between the audio and video carriers is 5.5 MHz.

- Frame rate: 25 Hz
- Interlace: 2/1
- Field rate: 50 Hz
- Lines/frame: 625
- Line rate: 15.625 kHz
- Visual bandwidth: 5 MHz
- Vision modulation: AC3 negative
- Preemphasis: 50 μs
- Sound modulation: F3
- Sound offset: 5.5 MHz
- Channel bandwidth: 8 MHz

A frame is the total picture. The frame rate is the number of pictures displayed in one second. But each frame is actually scanned twice interleaving odd and even lines. Each scan is known as a field (odd and even fields.) So field rate is twice the frame rate. In each frame there are 625 lines (or 312.5 lines in a field.) So line rate (line frequency) is 625 times the frame frequency or 625×25=15625 Hz.

The RF parameters of the transmitted signal are exactly the same as those for System B which is used on the 7.0 MHz wide channels of the VHF bands. The only difference is the width of the guard band between the channels, which on System G is 1.0 MHz wider than for System B: in other words 1.15 MHz (assuming the worst case which is when NICAM sound is in use).

== System H ==
A few countries (Belgium, Luxembourg, and Netherlands) use a variant of system G which is known as System H. System H is similar to system G but the lower (vestigial) side band is 500 kHz wider. This makes much better use of the 8.0 MHz channels of the UHF bands by reducing the width of the guard-band by 500 kHz to the still perfectly generous value of 650 kHz.

== See also ==
- Broadcast television systems
- Television transmitter
- Transposer
- Television channel frequencies
