= Synchronization of TV transmitter and receiver =

TV scanning pattern and synchronisation

In general, synchronizations is the process in which the signals are transmitted and received in accordance with the clock pulses. In synchronization of Television transmitter, a sharp pulse is sent between each video signal line so that to maintain the impeccable transmitter-receiver synchronization. The receiver detects the video signal, synchronizing the transmitter and receiver is necessary to overcome the delay between different video packet arrivals. The receiver must start scanning same line on the CRT output display or picture tube when the TV camera starts scanning that line, these are the horizontal lines that are being scanned. The scanning speed of transmitter and receiver must be same so as to avoid signal distortion and deformation at the image in receiver output. When horizontal lines are completely scanned, vertical flyback or retrace must occur simultaneously at both transmitter and receiver moving the electron beam from bottom line end to the start of the top line. When the electron beam is returned to the left-hand side to start tracing a new line during the horizontal retrace, must occur inadvertently at both transmitter and receiver.

- Cathode ray tube
- Television transmitter
- Vertical blanking interval
- Terrestrial television
