= CCIR System B =

625-line analog television transmission format

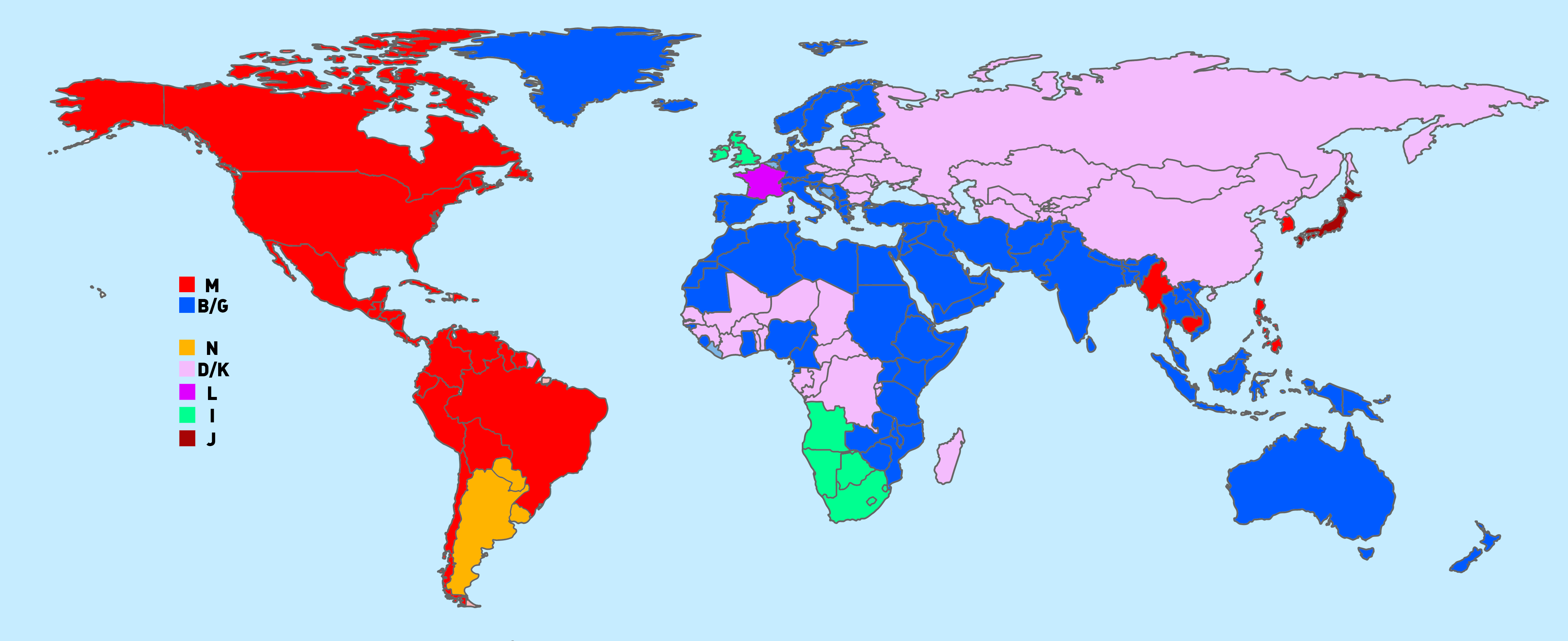
Analog TV systems global map, with System B in blue.

CCIR System B (originally known as the "Gerber Standard") was the 625-line VHF analog broadcast television system which at its peak was adopted by more than one hundred countries, either with PAL or SECAM colour. It is usually associated with CCIR System G for UHF broadcasts.

System B was the first internationally accepted 625-line broadcasting standard in the world. A first 625-line system with a 8 MHz channel bandwidth was proposed at the CCIR Conference in Stockholm in July 1948 (based on 1946-48 studies in the Soviet Union by Mark Krivosheev). At a CCIR Geneva meeting in July 1950 Dr. Gerber (a Swiss engineer), proposed a modified 625-lines system with a 7 MHz channel bandwidth (based on work by Telefunken and Walter Bruch), with the support of Belgium, Denmark, Italy, Netherlands, Sweden, and Switzerland. Known as the "Gerber-norm", it was eventually approved along with four other broadcast standards on the next formal CCIR meeting in May 1951 in Geneva.

In the 1960s, the capital of Mexico, Mexico City decided to replace System B with 525-line CCIR System M, despite the recommendations of Guillermo González regarding the technical advantages of System B.

It is mostly replaced across Western Europe, former Yugoslavia, parts of Asia and Africa by digital broadcasting.

== Specifications ==
The system was developed for VHF (also known as VHF-3) band (part of RF band lower than 300 MHz.) Some of the most important specs are listed below:

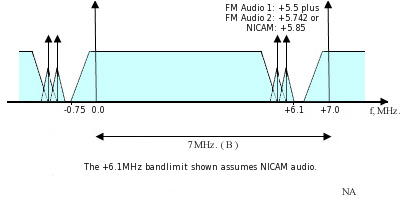
Channel spacing for CCIR television System B (VHF Bands) The separation between the aural and visual carriers is 5.5 MHz.

- Frame rate: 25 Hz
- Interlace: 2/1
- Field rate: 50 Hz
- Lines/frame: 625
- Line rate: 15.625 kHz
- Visual bandwidth: 5 MHz
- Vision modulation: AC3 negative
- Preemphasis: 50 μs
- Sound modulation: F3
- Sound offset: 5.5 MHz
- Channel bandwidth: 7 MHz

A frame is the total picture. The frame rate is the number of pictures displayed in one second. But each frame is actually scanned twice interleaving odd and even lines. Each scan is known as a field (odd and even fields.) So field rate is twice the frame rate. In each frame there are 625 lines (or 312.5 lines in a field.) So line rate (line frequency) is 625 times the frame frequency or 625×25=15625 Hz.

The video bandwidth is 5.0 MHz. The video signal modulates the carrier by amplitude modulation. But a portion of the lower side band is suppressed. This technique is known as vestigial side band modulation (AC3). The polarity of modulation is negative, meaning that an increase in the instantaneous brightness of the video signal results in a decrease in RF power and vice versa. Specifically, the sync pulses (being "blacker than black") result in maximum power from the transmitter.

The primary audio signal is modulated by frequency modulation with a preemphasis time constant of $\tau$ = 50 μs. The deviation for a 1.0 kHz. AF signal is 50 kHz.

The separation between the primary audio FM subcarrier and the video carrier is 5.5 MHz.

The total RF bandwidth of System B (as originally designed with its single FM audio subcarrier) was 6.5 MHz, allowing System B to be transmitted in the 7.0 MHz wide channels specified for television in the VHF bands with an ample 500 kHz guard zone between channels.

In specs, sometimes, other parameters such as vestigial sideband characteristics and gamma correction of the display device are also given.

=== Colour TV ===
System B has variously been used with both the PAL or SECAM colour systems. It could have been used with a 625-line variant of the NTSC color system, but apart from possible technical tests in the 1950s, this has never been done officially.

When used with PAL, the colour subcarrier is 4.43361875 MHz and the sidebands of the PAL signal have to be truncated on the high-frequency side at +570 kHz (matching the rolloff of the luminance signal at +5.0 MHz). On the low-frequency side, the full 1.3 MHz sideband is radiated. (This behaviour would cause massive U/V crosstalk in the NTSC system, but delay-line PAL hides such artefacts.)

When used with SECAM, the 'R' lines' carrier is at 4.40625 MHz deviating from +350±18 kHz to -506±25 kHz. The 'B' lines' carrier is at 4.250 MHz deviating +506±25 kHz to -350±18 kHz.

Neither colour encoding system has any effect on the bandwidth of system B as a whole.

=== Improved audio ===
Enhancements have been made to the specification of System B's audio capabilities over the years. The introduction of Zweikanalton in 1981 allowed for stereo sound or twin monophonic audio tracks (possibly in different languages for instance). This was implemented by adding a second FM audio subcarrier at +5.74 MHz. Alternatively, starting in the late 1980s and early 1990s it became possible to replace the second audio FM subcarrier with a digital signal carrying NICAM sound. Either of these extensions to audio capability have eaten into the guard band between channels. Zweiton uses an extra 150 kHz. The alternative NICAM system uses an extra 500 kHz, and needs to be spaced further from the primary audio subcarrier, thus System B with NICAM has only 150 kHz guard zones between channels.

== Transmission channels ==
Plan showing VHF frequency ranges for ITU Systems

The European 41-68 MHz Band I television allocation was agreed at the 1947 ITU (International Telecommunication Union) conference in 1947, and the first European channel plan (i.e. the use of channels E2 - E4) was agreed in 1952 at the ITU conference in Stockholm. The extension to VHF Band III (i.e. Channels E5 - E12) was also agreed in the 1950s.

Since then, the System B specification has been used with slightly different broadcast frequencies in many other countries.

=== Western Europe; Greenland; and most countries in Asia, Africa, and Oceania ===
Channel	Channel limits (MHz)	Vision carrier frequency (MHz)	Main audio carrier frequency (MHz)
E1 †	40.00 - 47.00	41.25	46.75
E1A †	41.00 - 48.00	42.25	47.75
E2 §	47.00 - 54.00	48.25	53.75
E2A §	48.25 - 55.50	49.75	55.25
E3	54.00 - 61.00	55.25	60.75
E4	61.00 - 68.00	62.25	67.75
E4A	81.00 - 88.00	82.25	87.75

† Channel 1 was allocated, but never used.

§ Not used in the former East Germany

Channel	Channel limits (MHz)	Vision carrier frequency (MHz)	Main audio carrier frequency (MHz)
E5	174.00 - 181.00	175.25	180.75
E6	181.00 - 188.00	182.25	187.75
E7	188.00 - 195.00	189.25	194.75
E8	195.00 - 202.00	196.25	201.75
E9	202.00 - 209.00	203.25	208.75
E10	209.00 - 216.00	210.25	215.75
E11	216.00 - 223.00	217.25	222.75
E12	223.00 - 230.00	224.25	229.75

==== East Germany before the 1960s ====
Channel	Channel limits (MHz)	Vision carrier frequency (MHz)	Main audio carrier frequency (MHz)
1	58.00 - 65.00	59.25	64.75

Channel	Channel limits (MHz)	Vision carrier frequency (MHz)	Main audio carrier frequency (MHz)
2	144.00 - 151.00	145.25	150.75
3	154.00 - 161.00	155.25	160.75
E5	174.00 - 181.00	175.25	180.75
E6	181.00 - 188.00	182.25	187.75
E8	195.00 - 202.00	196.25	201.75
E11	216.00 - 223.00	217.25	222.75

Transmitters were operational on the above channels in 1959. During the 1960s, channels 1 to 3 were deleted and channels E3 to E12 adopted, bringing East Germany into line with the channel allocations used in the West.

=== Italy ===
Italian channel-spacings were erratic. System B is no longer in use in Italy, the switchover to DVB-T having been completed 4 July 2012.

Channel	Channel limits (MHz)	Vision carrier frequency (MHz)	Audio carrier frequency (MHz)
IA	52.50 - 59.50	53.75	59.25
IB	61.00 - 68.00	62.25	67.75
IC (Note: Same as E4A)	81.00 - 88.00	82.25	87.75

Note: Band I is no longer used for television in Italy.

Channel	Channel limits (MHz)	Vision carrier frequency (MHz)	Audio carrier frequency (MHz)
ID (Note: Same as E5)	174.00 - 181.00	175.25	180.75
IE	182.50 - 189.50	183.75	189.25
IF	191.00 - 198.00	192.25	197.75
IG	200.00 - 207.00	201.25	206.75
IH (Note: Same as E10)	209.00 - 216.00	210.25	215.75
IH1 (Note: Same as E11)	216.00 - 223.00	217.25	222.75
IH2 (Note: Same as E12)	223.00 - 230.00	224.25	229.75

Note: Unusually for Europe, Band III is used for DVB-T in Italy. At digital switchover time, Italy took the opportunity to discontinue their erratic System B frequencies, and the digital channels (known as Ch5 through Ch12) are regularly-spaced every 7.0 MHz from 177.5 MHz (and identical to Germany's Band III DVB-T bandplan).

=== Australia VHF (until 1993) ===
Australia (along with Japan, System J and Eastern Europe, System D) were unique in the world by their use of Band II for television broadcasting.

Channel	Channel limits (MHz)	Vision carrier frequency (MHz)	Main audio carrier frequency (MHz)
D0	45.00 - 52.00	46.25	51.75
D1	56.00 - 63.00	57.25	62.75
D2	63.00 - 70.00	64.25	69.75

Channel	Channel limits (MHz)	Vision carrier frequency (MHz)	Main audio carrier frequency (MHz)
D3	85.00 - 92.00	86.25	91.75
D4	94.00 - 101.00	95.25	100.75
D5	101.00 - 108.00	102.25	107.75
D5A	137.00 - 144.00	138.25	143.75

Channel	Channel limits (MHz)	Vision carrier frequency (MHz)	Main audio carrier frequency (MHz)
D6	174.00 - 181.00	175.25	180.75
D7	181.00 - 188.00	182.25	194.75
D8	188.00 - 195.00	189.25	194.75
D9	195.00 - 202.00	196.25	201.75
D10	208.00 - 215.00	209.25	214.75
D11	215.00 - 222.00	216.25	221.75

=== Australia VHF (after 1993) ===
Channel	Channel limits (MHz)	Vision carrier frequency (MHz)	Main audio carrier frequency (MHz)
D0	45.00 - 52.00	46.25	51.75
D1	56.00 - 63.00	57.25	62.75
D2	63.00 - 70.00	64.25	69.75

Channel	Channel limits (MHz)	Vision carrier frequency (MHz)	Main audio carrier frequency (MHz)
D3 ‡	85.00 - 92.00	86.25	91.75
D4 ‡	94.00 - 101.00	95.25	100.75
D5 ‡	101.00 - 108.00	102.25	107.75
D5A	137.00 - 144.00	138.25	143.75

‡ Channels 3, 4 and 5 were scheduled to be cleared during 1993–96 to make way for FM radio stations in Band II. This clearance action took much longer than was anticipated, and as a result, many stations on channel 3 still remain, along with a few on 4 and 5.

Channel	Channel limits (MHz)	Vision carrier frequency (MHz)	Main audio carrier frequency (MHz)
D6	174.00 - 181.00	175.25	180.75
D7	181.00 - 188.00	182.25	194.75
D8	188.00 - 195.00	189.25	194.75
D9	195.00 - 202.00	196.25	201.75
D9A ♦	202.00 - 209.00	203.25	208.75
D10 ‡	209.00 - 216.00	210.25	215.75
D11 ‡	216.00 - 223.00	217.25	222.75
D12 ♦	223.00 - 230.00	224.25	229.75

♦ New channel allocations from 1993.

‡ Channels 10 and 11 were shifted up in frequency by 1 MHz to make room for channel 9A. The frequencies of existing stations did not change; only new ones used the new allocations. Digital multiplexes on channels 10 and 11 are using the new channel boundaries.

=== Australia UHF ===
Australia is nearly unique in the world for their use of 7 MHz channel-spacing (and therefore System B) on UHF.

Channel	Channel limits (MHz)	Vision carrier frequency (MHz)	Main audio carrier frequency (MHz)
D28	526.00 - 533.00	527.25	532.75
D29	533.00 - 540.00	534.25	539.75
D30	540.00 - 547.00	541.25	546.75
D31	547.00 - 554.00	548.25	553.75
D32	554.00 - 561.00	555.25	560.75
D33	561.00 - 568.00	562.25	567.75
D34	568.00 - 575.00	569.25	574.75
D35	575.00 - 582.00	576.25	581.75
D36	582.00 - 589.00	583.25	588.75
D37	589.00 - 596.00	590.25	595.75
D38	596.00 - 603.00	597.25	602.75
D39	603.00 - 610.00	604.25	609.75
D40	610.00 - 617.00	611.25	616.75
D41	617.00 - 624.00	618.25	623.75
D42	624.00 - 631.00	625.25	630.75
D43	631.00 - 638.00	632.25	637.75
D44	638.00 - 645.00	639.25	644.75
D45	645.00 - 652.00	646.25	651.75
D46	652.00 - 659.00	653.25	658.75
D47	659.00 - 666.00	660.25	665.75
D48	666.00 - 673.00	667.25	672.75
D49	673.00 - 680.00	674.25	679.75
D50	680.00 - 687.00	681.25	686.75
D51	687.00 - 694.00	688.25	693.75
D52	694.00 - 701.00	695.25	700.75
D53	701.00 - 708.00	702.25	707.75
D54	708.00 - 715.00	709.25	714.75
D55	715.00 - 722.00	716.25	721.75
D56	722.00 - 729.00	723.25	728.75
D57	729.00 - 736.00	730.25	735.75
D58	736.00 - 743.00	737.25	742.75
D59	743.00 - 750.00	744.25	749.75
D60	750.00 - 757.00	751.25	756.75
D61	757.00 - 764.00	758.25	763.75
D62	764.00 - 771.00	765.25	770.75
D63	771.00 - 778.00	772.25	777.75
D64	778.00 - 785.00	779.25	784.75
D65	785.00 - 792.00	786.25	791.75
D66	792.00 - 799.00	793.25	798.75
D67	799.00 - 806.00	800.25	805.75
D68	806.00 - 813.00	807.25	812.75
D69	813.00 - 820.00	814.25	819.75

=== New Zealand and Indonesia ===
Channel	Channel limits (MHz)	Vision carrier frequency (MHz)	Main audio carrier frequency (MHz)
G1A	43.00 - 50.00	44.25	49.75
G1	44.00 - 51.00	45.25	50.75
G2	54.00 - 61.00	55.25	60.75
G3	61.00 - 68.00	62.25	67.75

Channel	Channel limits (MHz)	Vision carrier frequency (MHz)	Main audio carrier frequency (MHz)
G4	174.00 - 181.00	175.25	180.75
G5	181.00 - 188.00	182.25	187.75
G6	188.00 - 195.00	189.25	194.75
G7	195.00 - 202.00	196.25	201.75
G8	202.00 - 209.00	203.25	208.75
G9	209.00 - 216.00	210.25	215.75
G10 †	216.00 - 223.00	217.25	222.75
G11 †	223.00 - 230.00	224.25	229.75

† Channels 10 and 11 weren't added until the late 1980s.

Note: The Band III frequencies are the same as Australia. Channel G1A is only used in Indonesia.

=== Morocco ===
Channel	Channel limits (MHz)	Vision carrier frequency (MHz)	Main audio carrier frequency (MHz)
M4	162.00 - 169.00	163.25	168.75
M5	170.00 - 177.00	171.25	176.75
M6	178.00 - 185.00	179.25	184.75
M7	186.00 - 193.00	187.25	192.75
M8	194.00 - 201.00	195.25	200.75
M9	202.00 - 209.00	203.25	208.75
M10	210.00 - 217.00	211.25	216.75

== System G and H ==
When the UHF bands came into use in the early 1960s, two variants of System B began to be used on those frequencies.

In most countries, the channels on the UHF bands are 8 MHz wide, but in most system B countries transmissions on the UHF channels still use system B specifications, the only difference being that the guard band between the channels is 1.0 MHz wider than for System B. That system for the UHF bands is known as System G and all RF specifications given above (apart from the guard band width) also apply to system G. Exceptions to this would seem to be Australia, Brunei and Tanzania where the UHF channels are 7 MHz wide, and system B is used on UHF just as it is on VHF.

A few countries (Belgium, several of the Balkan states and Malta) use another variant of system B on UHF which is known as System H. System H is similar to system G but the lower (vestigial) side band is 500 kHz wider. This makes much better use of the 8.0 MHz channels of the UHF bands (though whether any system B/H televisions actually made use of the extra bandwidth is not known).

== See also ==
- Broadcast television systems
- Television transmitter
- Transposer
- CCIR System G
- Television channel frequencies
