= CCIR System K =

625-line analog television transmission format

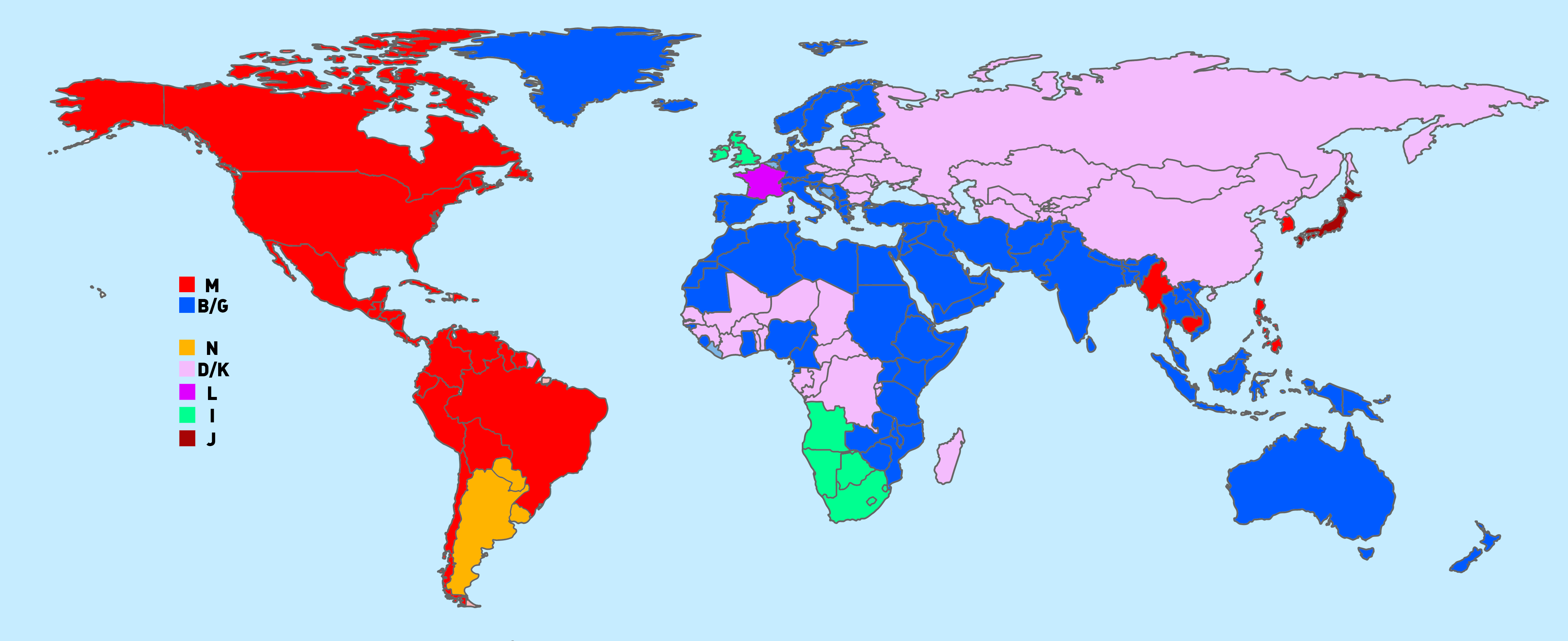
Analog TV systems global map, with System K in pink.

CCIR System K is an analog broadcast television system used in countries that adopted CCIR System D on VHF, and in Benin, Guinea, Republic of the Congo, Togo, Senegal, Burkina Faso, Burundi, Ivory Coast, Gabon, Comoros, Democratic Republic of the Congo, Madagascar, Mali, Nigeria, Réunion, Rwanda, Chad, Central African Republic, French Polynesia, New Caledonia, Wallis and Futuna, Guadeloupe, Martinique, Saint Pierre and Miquelon, and French Guiana.

It is identical System D in most respects. Used only for UHF frequencies, its paired with SECAM or PAL color systems.

== Specifications ==
Some of the important specs are listed below:

- Frame rate: 25 Hz
- Interlace: 2/1
- Field rate: 50 Hz
- Lines/frame: 625
- Line rate: 15.625 kHz
- Visual bandwidth: 6 MHz
- Vision modulation: Negative
- Preemphasis: 50 μs
- Sound modulation: FM
- Sound offset: +6.5 MHz
- Channel bandwidth: 8 MHz

Television channels were arranged as follows:

System K UHF channels
| Channel | Video carrier (MHz) | Audio carrier (MHz) |
|---|---|---|
| 21 | 471.25 | 477.75 |
| 22 | 479.25 | 485.75 |
| 23 | 487.25 | 493.75 |
| 24 | 495.25 | 501.75 |
| 25 | 503.25 | 509.75 |
| 26 | 511.25 | 517.75 |
| 27 | 519.25 | 525.75 |
| 28 | 527.25 | 533.75 |
| 29 | 535.25 | 541.75 |
| 30 | 543.25 | 549.75 |
| 31 | 551.25 | 557.75 |
| 32 | 559.25 | 565.75 |
| 33 | 567.25 | 573.75 |
| 34 | 575.25 | 581.75 |
| 35 | 583.25 | 589.75 |
| 36 | 591.25 | 597.75 |
| 37 | 599.25 | 605.75 |
| 38 | 607.25 | 613.75 |
| 39 | 615.25 | 621.75 |
| 40 | 623.25 | 629.75 |
| 41 | 631.25 | 637.75 |
| 42 | 639.25 | 645.75 |
| 43 | 647.25 | 653.75 |
| 44 | 655.25 | 661.75 |
| 45 | 663.25 | 669.75 |
| 46 | 671.25 | 677.75 |
| 47 | 679.25 | 685.75 |
| 48 | 687.25 | 693.75 |
| 49 | 695.25 | 701.75 |
| 50 | 703.25 | 709.75 |
| 51 | 711.25 | 717.75 |
| 52 | 719.25 | 725.75 |
| 53 | 727.25 | 733.75 |
| 54 | 735.25 | 741.75 |
| 55 | 743.25 | 749.75 |
| 56 | 751.25 | 757.75 |
| 57 | 759.25 | 765.75 |
| 58 | 767.25 | 773.75 |
| 59 | 775.25 | 781.75 |
| 60 | 783.25 | 789.75 |
| 61 | 791.25 | 797.75 |
| 62 | 799.25 | 805.75 |
| 63 | 807.25 | 813.75 |
| 64 | 815.25 | 821.75 |
| 65 | 823.25 | 829.75 |
| 66 | 831.25 | 837.75 |
| 67 | 839.25 | 845.75 |
| 68 | 847.25 | 853.75 |
| 69 | 855.25 | 861.75 |

== System K1 ==
Plan showing VHF frequency ranges for ITU Systems

French overseas departments and territories used a variation named System K1 for broadcast in VHF. UHF channels were similar to K.

System K1 VHF channels
| Channel | Video carrier (MHz) | Audio carrier (MHz) |
|---|---|---|
| 2 | 52.25 | 58.75 |
| 3 | 60.25 | 66.75 |
| 4 | 175.25 | 181.75 |
| 5 | 183.25 | 189.75 |
| 6 | 191.25 | 197.75 |
| 7 | 199.25 | 205.75 |
| 8 | 207.25 | 213.75 |
| 9 | 215.25 | 221.75 |
| 10 | 223.25 | 229.75 |

== See also ==
- Broadcast television systems
- Television transmitter
- Transposer
