= Broadcast television systems =

Standards for terrestrial television signals

Broadcast television systems (or terrestrial television systems outside the US and Canada) are the encoding or formatting systems for the transmission and reception of terrestrial television signals.

Analog television systems were standardized by the International Telecommunication Union (ITU) in 1961, with each system designated by a letter (A-N) in combination with the color standard used (NTSC, PAL or SECAM) - for example PAL-B, NTSC-M, etc.). These analog systems for TV broadcasting dominated until the 2000s.

With the introduction of digital terrestrial television (DTT), they were replaced by four main systems in use around the world: ATSC, DVB, ISDB and DTMB.

== Analog television systems ==
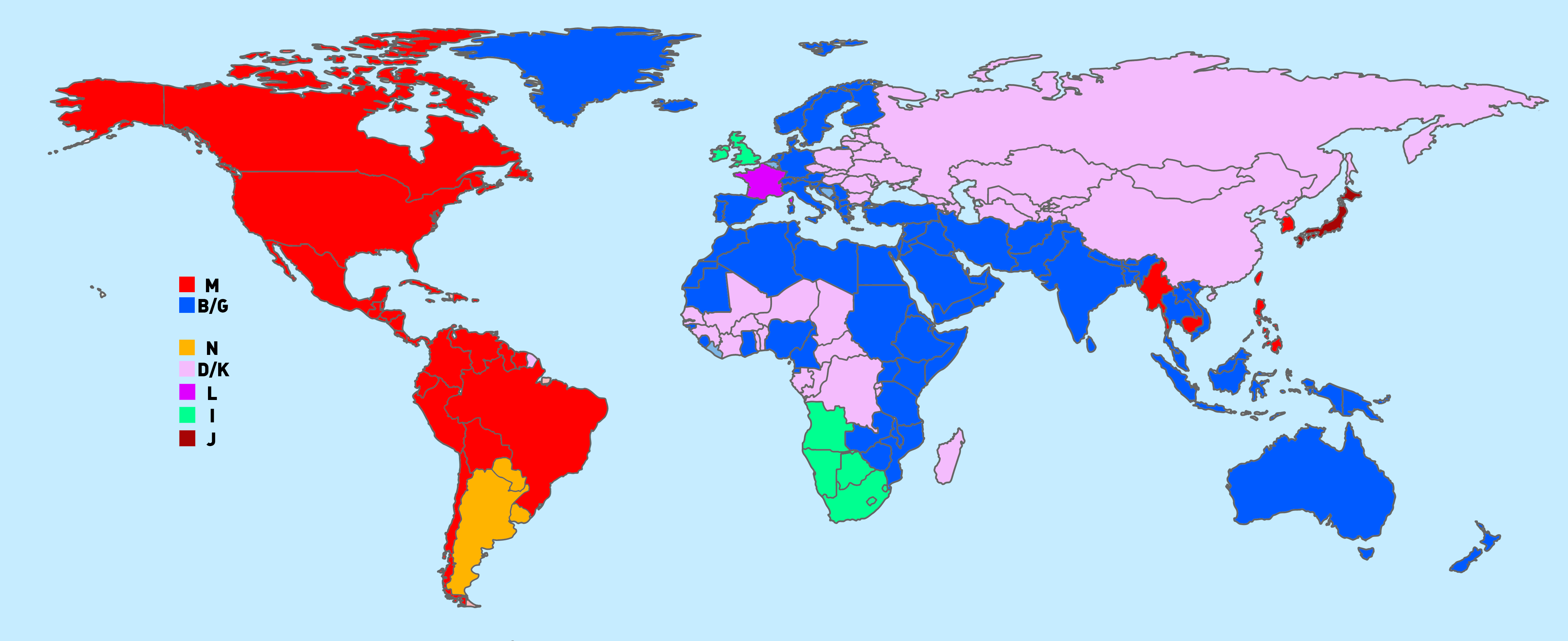
Analog television system by nation

Analog television encoding systems by nation (at time of digital switchover, where applicable): NTSC SECAM PAL No info

Every analog television system bar one began as a black-and-white system. Each country, faced with local political, technical, and economic issues, later adopted a color television standard which was grafted onto an existing monochrome system such as CCIR System M, using gaps in the video spectrum (explained below) to allow color transmission information to fit in the existing channels allotted. The grafting of the color transmission standards onto existing monochrome systems permitted existing monochrome television receivers predating the changeover to color television to continue to be operated as monochrome television. Because of this compatibility requirement, color standards added a second signal to the basic monochrome signal, which carries the color information. The color information is called chroma with the symbol C, while the black and white information is called the luminance with the symbol Y. Monochrome television receivers only display the luminance, while color receivers process both signals. Though in theory any monochrome system could be adopted to a color system, in practice some of the original monochrome systems proved impractical to adapt to color and were abandoned when the switch to color broadcasting was made. All countries used one of three color standards: NTSC, PAL, or SECAM. For example, CCIR System M was often used in conjunction with NTSC standard, to provide color analog television and the two together were known as NTSC-M.

=== Pre–World War II systems ===
A number of experimental and broadcast systems had been developed before the Second World War. The first ones were mechanical, had low resolution (180 lines in Germany, 240 lines in the UK), sometimes with no sound.

Later TV systems were electronic, and usually mentioned by their line number: 240-line (used in the US), 343-line (used in the US, USSR), 375-line (used in Germany, Italy, US), 405-line (used in the UK), 441-line (used in Germany, France, Italy, US, adopted but not widely used in the USSR) or 567-line (used in the Netherlands). These systems were mostly experimental and national, with no defined international standards, and did not resume broadcasting after the war except for the UK 405-line system, which resumed broadcasts and was the first to be standardized by ITU as System A, remaining in operation until 1985.

=== ITU standards ===
On an international conference in Stockholm in 1961, the International Telecommunication Union designated standards for broadcast television systems (ITU System Letter Designation). Each standard is designated by a letter (A-M).

On VHF bands I, II and III the 405, 625 and 819-line systems could be used:

- A – 405-line system, 5 MHz video bandwidth
- B – 625-line system, 7 MHz video bandwidth
- C – Belgian 625-line system, 7 MHz video bandwidth
- D – I.B.T.O. 625-line system, 8 MHz video bandwidth
- E – French 819-line system, 14 MHz video bandwidth
- F – Belgian 819-line system, 7 MHz video bandwidth

On UHF bands Bands IV and V only 625-line systems were adopted, with the difference being transmission parameters like channel bandwidth.

- G – 625-line system, 5 MHz video bandwidth
- H – 625-line system, 5 MHz video bandwidth
- I – 625-line system, 5.5 MHz video bandwidth
- K – 625-line system, 6 MHz video bandwidth
- L – 625-line system, 6 MHz video bandwidth

Following further conferences and the introduction of color television, by 1966 each standard was designated by a letter (A-M) in combination with a color standard (NTSC, PAL, SECAM). This completely specifies all of the monaural analog television systems in the world (for example, PAL-B, NTSC-M, etc.).

The following table gives the principal characteristics of each standard. Except for lines and frame rates, other units are megahertz (MHz).

- Also see: television channel frequencies

World analog television systems
System	Introduced	Lines	Frame rate (fps)	Usual color standard	Channel bandwidth (MHz)	Video bandwidth (MHz)	Vision/sound carrier separation (MHz)	Vestigial sideband (MHz)	Vision modulation (+, -)	Sound modulation (AM, FM)	Chrominance subcarrier frequency (MHz)	Vision/sound power ratio	Assumed display device gamma
A	1936	405	25		5	3	−3.5	0.75	+	AM	none	4:1	2.5 - 2.0
B	1950	625	25	PAL/SECAM	7	5	+5.5	0.75	-	FM	4.43		2.8
C	1953	625	25		7	5	+5.5	0.75	+	AM	none		2.0
D	1948	625	25	SECAM/PAL	8	6	+6.5	0.75	-	FM	4.43		2.8
E	1949	819	25		14	10	±11.15	2.00	+	AM	none		1.7
F	1953	819	25		7	5	+5.5	0.75	+	AM	none		2.0
G	1961	625	25	PAL/SECAM	8	5	+5.5	0.75	-	FM	4.43	5:1	2.8
H	1961	625	25	PAL	8	5	+5.5	1.25	-	FM	4.43	5:1	2.8
I	1962	625	25	PAL	8	5.5	+5.9996	1.25	-	FM	4.43	5:1	2.8
J	1953	525	30	NTSC	6	4.2	+4.5	0.75	-	FM	3.58		2.2
K	1961	625	25	SECAM/PAL	8	6	+6.5	0.75	-	FM	4.43	5:1	2.8
K1	1964	625	25	SECAM	8	6	+6.5	1.25	-	FM	4.43		2.8
L	1961	625	25	SECAM	8	6	-6.5	1.25	+	AM	4.43	8:1	2.8
M	1941	525	30	NTSC/PAL-M	6	4.2	+4.5	0.75	-	FM	3.58/3.56		2.2
N	1951	625	25	PAL	6	4.2	+4.5	0.75	-	FM	3.58		2.8

==== Notes by system ====
A
Early United Kingdom and Ireland VHF system (B&W only). First electronic TV system, introduced in 1936. Vestigial sideband filtering introduced in 1949. Discontinued on 23 November 1982 in Ireland and on 2 January 1985 in the UK.
B
VHF-only in most Western European countries (combined with system G and H on UHF); VHF and UHF in Australia. Originally known as the Gerber standard.
C
Early VHF system; used only in Belgium, Italy, the Netherlands, and Luxembourg, as a compromise between Systems B and L. Discontinued in 1977.
D
The first 625-line system. Used on VHF only in most countries (combined with system K on UHF); VHF and UHF in China.
E
Early French VHF system (B&W only); very good (near HDTV) picture quality but uneconomical use of bandwidth. Sound carrier separation +11.15 MHz on odd numbered channels, -11.15 MHz on even numbered channels. Discontinued in 1984 (France) and 1985 (Monaco).
F
Early VHF system used only in Belgium and Luxembourg; allowed French 819-line television programming to be broadcast on the 7 MHz VHF channels used in those countries, at a substantial cost in horizontal resolution. Discontinued in 1968 (Belgium) and 1971 (Luxembourg).
G
UHF only; used in countries with System B on VHF, except Australia.
H
UHF only; used only in Belgium, Luxembourg, and the Netherlands. Similar to System G with a 1.25 MHz vestigal sideband.
I
Used in the UK, Ireland, Southern Africa, Macau, Hong Kong, and Falkland Islands.
J
Used in Japan (see system M below). Identical to system M except that a different black level of 0 IRE is used instead of 7.5 IRE. Although the ITU specified a frame rate of 30 fields, 29.97 was adopted with the introduction of NTSC color to minimize visual artifacts. Discontinued in 2011, when Japan transitioned to digital.
K
UHF only; used in countries with system D on VHF, except China, and identical to it in most respects.
K1
Used only in French overseas departments and territories.
L
Used only in France. On VHF Band 1 only, the audio is at −6.5 MHz. Discontinued in 2005, when France transitioned to digital. It was the last system to use positive video modulation and AM sound.
M
Used in most of the Americas and Caribbean (except Argentina, Paraguay, Uruguay, and French Guiana), Myanmar, South Korea, Taiwan, Philippines (all NTSC-M), Brazil (PAL-M), Vietnam, Cambodia, and Laos (all SECAM-M). Although the ITU specified a frame rate of 30 fields, 29.97 was adopted with the introduction of NTSC color to minimize visual artifacts.
N
Adopted by Argentina, Paraguay, and Uruguay (all PAL-N since 1978).

=== Evolution ===
For historical reasons, some countries use a different video system on UHF than they do on the VHF bands. In a few countries, most notably the United Kingdom, television broadcasting on VHF has been entirely shut down. The British 405-line system A, unlike all the other systems, suppressed the upper sideband rather than the lower—befitting its status as the oldest operating television system to survive into the color era (although was never officially broadcast with color encoding). System A was tested with all three color standards, and production equipment was designed and ready to be built; System A might have survived, as NTSC-A, had the British government not decided to harmonize with the rest of Europe on a 625-line video system, implemented in Britain as PAL-I on UHF only.

The French 819 line system E was a post-war effort to advance France's standing in television technology. Its 819 lines were almost high definition even by today's standards. Like the British system A, it was VHF only and remained black & white until its shutdown in 1984 in France and 1985 in Monaco. It was tested with SECAM standard in the early stages, but later the decision was made to adopt color in 625-lines L system only. Thus, France adopted system L both on UHF and VHF networks and abandoned system E.

Japan had the earliest working HDTV system (MUSE), with design efforts going back to 1979. The country began broadcasting wideband analog high-definition video signals in the late 1980s using an interlaced resolution of 1,125 lines, supported by the Sony HDVS line of equipment.

In many parts of the world, analog television broadcasting has been shut down completely, or in process of shutdown; see Digital television transition for a timeline of the analog shutdown.

=== Technical aspects ===
==== Frames ====
Ignoring color, all television systems work in essentially the same manner. The monochrome image seen by a camera (later, the luminance component of a color image) is divided into horizontal scan lines, some number of which make up a single image or frame. A monochrome image is theoretically continuous, and thus unlimited in horizontal resolution, but to make television practical, a limit had to be placed on the bandwidth of the television signal, which puts an ultimate limit on the horizontal resolution possible. When color was introduced, this limit necessarily became fixed. All analog television systems are interlaced: alternate rows of the frame are transmitted in sequence, followed by the remaining rows in their sequence. Each half of the frame is called a video field, and the rate at which fields are transmitted is one of the fundamental parameters of a video system. It is related to the utility frequency at which the electricity distribution system operates, to avoid flicker resulting from the beat between the television screen deflection system and nearby mains generated magnetic fields. All digital, or "fixed pixel," displays have progressive scanning and must deinterlace an interlaced source. Use of inexpensive deinterlacing hardware is a typical difference between lower- vs. higher-priced flat panel displays (Plasma display, LCD, etc.).

All films and other filmed material shot at 24 frames per second must be transferred to video frame rates using a telecine in order to prevent severe motion jitter effects. Typically, for 25 frame/s formats (European among other countries with 50 Hz mains supply), the content is PAL speedup, while a technique known as "3:2 pulldown" is used for 30 frame/s formats (North America among other countries with 60 Hz mains supply) to match the film frame rate to the video frame rate without speeding up the play back.

==== Viewing technology ====
Analog television signal standards are designed to be displayed on a cathode ray tube (CRT), and so the physics of these devices necessarily controls the format of the video signal. The image on a CRT is painted by a moving beam of electrons which hits a phosphor coating on the front of the tube. This electron beam is steered by a magnetic field generated by powerful electromagnets close to the source of the electron beam.

In order to reorient this magnetic steering mechanism, a certain amount of time is required due to the inductance of the magnets; the greater the change, the greater the time it takes for the electron beam to settle in the new spot.

For this reason, it is necessary to shut off the electron beam (corresponding to a video signal of zero luminance) during the time it takes to reorient the beam from the end of one line to the beginning of the next (horizontal retrace) and from the bottom of the screen to the top (vertical retrace or vertical blanking interval). The horizontal retrace is accounted for in the time allotted to each scan line, but the vertical retrace is accounted for as phantom lines which are never displayed but which are included in the number of lines per frame defined for each video system. Since the electron beam must be turned off in any case, the result is gaps in the television signal, which can be used to transmit other information, such as test signals or color identification signals.

The temporal gaps translate into a comb-like frequency spectrum for the signal, where the teeth are spaced at line frequency and concentrate most of the energy; the space between the teeth can be used to insert a color subcarrier.

==== Hidden signaling in analogue transmissions ====
Broadcasters later developed mechanisms to transmit digital information on the phantom lines, used mostly for teletext and closed captioning:

- Widescreen signaling to indicate several video format modes, used on both on-air and on consumer equipment like DVD players. The main use was to indicate that kind of widescreen image (14:9, 16:9, 21:9 and position) is being broadcast and if other optional signals are present. This allows the TV set to switch to the appropriate display mode automatically. One bit indicates if (Dolby Prologic) Surround is being broadcast.
- PALplus uses hidden signaling to indicate if encoded PALplus helper signals exist hidden in the black bars of 16:9 transmissions and if so what operational mode is being used. These helper signals are used on PALplus compatible TV's to restore full resolution of wide screen video and reduce common PAL artefacts.
- NTSC was modified by the Advanced Television Systems Committee to support an anti-ghosting signal that is inserted on a non-visible scan line. Also Widescreen signaling is used to indicate aspect ratio, helper signals and station ID's.
- NTSC Closed Captioning signaling uses signaling that is nearly identical to teletext signaling.
- Teletext uses hidden signaling to transmit information pages (PAL countries).
- Sound-in-syncs, the digital iterations of this system allowed transmission of digital audio inside the horizontal sync/blanking. Often used for high quality stereo or surround sound, or mono multi language audio. One version also was used to scramble subscription movie channels on analogue cable TV.
- NICAM-728, developed by BBC Research & Development, was used to broadcast compressed digital audio next to the regular analogue audio carrier.

==== Overscan ====
Television images incorporate regions of the picture with reasonable-quality content outside the normal display.

==== Interlacing ====
In a purely analog system, field order is merely a matter of convention. For digitally recorded material it becomes necessary to rearrange the field order when conversion takes place from one standard to another.

==== Image signal polarity ====
Another parameter of analog television systems, minor by comparison, is the choice of whether vision modulation is positive or negative. Some of the earliest electronic television systems such as the British 405-line (System A) used positive modulation. It was also used in the two Belgian systems (System C, 625 lines, and System F, 819 lines) and the two French systems (System E, 819 lines, and System L, 625 lines). In positive modulation systems, as in the earlier white facsimile transmission standard, the maximum luminance value is represented by the maximum carrier power; in negative modulation, the maximum luminance value is represented by zero carrier power. All newer analog video systems use negative modulation with the exception of the French System L.

Impulse noise, especially from older automotive ignition systems, caused white spots to appear on the screens of television receivers using positive modulation but they could use simple synchronization circuits. Impulse noise in negative-modulation systems appears as dark spots that are less visible, but picture synchronization was seriously degraded when using simple synchronization. The synchronization problem was overcome with the invention of phase-locked synchronization circuits. When these first appeared in Britain in the early 1950s one name used to describe them was "flywheel synchronisation."

Older televisions for positive-modulation systems were sometimes equipped with a peak video signal inverter that would turn the white interference spots dark. This was usually user-adjustable with a control on the rear of the television labeled "White Spot Limiter" in Britain or "Antiparasite" in France. If adjusted incorrectly it would turn bright white picture content dark. Most of the positive modulation television systems ceased operation by the mid-1980s. The French System L continued on up to the transition to digital broadcasting. Positive modulation was one of several unique technical features that originally protected the French electronics and broadcasting industry from foreign competition and rendered French TV sets incapable of receiving broadcasts from neighboring countries.

Another advantage of negative modulation is that, since the synchronizing pulses represent maximum carrier power, it is relatively easy to arrange the receiver automatic gain control to only operate during sync pulses and thus get a constant amplitude video signal to drive the rest of the TV set. This was not possible for many years with positive modulation as the peak carrier power varied depending on picture content. Modern digital processing circuits have achieved a similar effect but using the front porch of the video signal.

==== Modulation ====
Given all of these parameters, the result is a mostly continuous analog signal which can be modulated onto a radio-frequency carrier and transmitted through an antenna. All analog television systems use vestigial sideband modulation, a form of amplitude modulation in which one sideband is partially removed. This reduces the bandwidth of the transmitted signal, enabling narrower channels to be used.

==== Audio ====
In analog television, the analog audio portion of a broadcast is invariably modulated separately from the video. Most commonly, the audio and video are combined at the transmitter before being presented to the antenna, but separate aural and visual antennas can be used. In all cases where negative video is used, FM is used for the standard monaural audio; systems with positive video use AM sound and intercarrier receiver technology cannot be incorporated. Stereo, or more generally multi-channel, audio is encoded using a number of schemes which (except in the French systems) are independent of the video system. The principal systems are NICAM, which uses a digital audio encoding; double-FM (known under a variety of names, notably Zweikanalton, A2 Stereo, West German Stereo, German Stereo or IGR Stereo), in which case each audio channel is separately modulated in FM and added to the broadcast signal; and BTSC (also known as MTS), which multiplexes additional audio channels into the FM audio carrier. All three systems are compatible with monaural FM audio, but only NICAM may be used with the French AM audio systems.

== Digital television systems ==
The situation with worldwide digital television is much simpler by comparison. Most digital television systems are based on the MPEG transport stream standard, and use the H.262/MPEG-2 Part 2 video codec. They differ significantly in the details of how the transport stream is converted into a broadcast signal, in the video format prior to encoding (or alternatively, after decoding), and in the audio format. This has not prevented the creation of an international standard that includes both major systems, even though they are incompatible in almost every respect.

The two principal digital broadcasting systems are ATSC standards, developed by the Advanced Television Systems Committee and adopted as a standard in most of North America, and DVB-T, the Digital Video Broadcast – Terrestrial system used in most of the rest of the world. DVB-T was designed for format compatibility with existing direct broadcast satellite services in Europe (which use the DVB-S standard, and also sees some use in direct-to-home satellite dish providers in North America), and there is also a DVB-C version for cable television. While the ATSC standard also includes support for satellite and cable television systems, operators of those systems have chosen other technologies (principally DVB-S or proprietary systems for satellite and 256QAM replacing VSB for cable). Japan uses a third system, closely related to DVB-T, called ISDB-T, which is compatible with Brazil's SBTVD. The People's Republic of China has developed a fourth system, named DMB-T/H.

DTT broadcasting systems

=== ATSC ===
The terrestrial ATSC system (unofficially ATSC-T) uses a proprietary Zenith-developed modulation called 8-VSB; as the name implies, it is a vestigial sideband technique. Essentially, analog VSB is to regular amplitude modulation as 8VSB is to eight-way quadrature amplitude modulation. This system was chosen specifically to provide for maximum spectral compatibility between existing analog TV and new digital stations in the United States' already-crowded television allocations system, although it is inferior to the other digital systems in dealing with multipath interference; however, it is better at dealing with impulse noise which is especially present on the VHF bands that other countries have discontinued from TV use, but are still used in the U.S. There is also no hierarchical modulation. After demodulation and error-correction, the 8-VSB modulation supports a digital data stream of about 19.39 Mbit/s, enough for one high-definition video stream or several standard-definition services. See Digital subchannel: Technical considerations for more information.

On November 17, 2017, the FCC voted 3-2 in favor of authorizing voluntary deployments of ATSC 3.0, which was designed as the successor to the original ATSC "1.0", and issued a Report and Order to that effect. Full-power stations will be required to maintain a simulcast of their channels on an ATSC 1.0-compatible signal if they decide to deploy an ATSC 3.0 service.

On cable, ATSC usually uses 256QAM, although some use 16VSB. Both of these double the throughput to 38.78 Mbit/s within the same 6 MHz bandwidth. ATSC is also used over satellite. While these are logically called ATSC-C and ATSC-S, these terms were never officially defined.

=== DTMB ===
DTMB is the digital television broadcasting standard of the Mainland China, Hong Kong and Macau. This is a fusion system, which is a compromise of different competing proposing standards from different Chinese Universities, which incorporates elements from DMB-T, ADTB-T and TiMi 3.

=== DVB ===
DVB-T uses coded orthogonal frequency division multiplexing (COFDM), which uses as many as 8000 independent carriers, each transmitting data at a comparatively low rate. This system was designed to provide superior immunity from multipath interference, and has a choice of system variants which allow data rates from 4 MBit/s up to 24 MBit/s. One US broadcaster, Sinclair Broadcasting, petitioned the Federal Communications Commission to permit the use of COFDM instead of 8-VSB, on the theory that this would improve prospects for digital TV reception by households without outside antennas (a majority in the US), but this request was denied. (However, one US digital station, WNYE-DT in New York, was temporarily converted to COFDM modulation on an emergency basis for datacasting information to emergency services personnel in lower Manhattan in the aftermath of the September 11 terrorist attacks).

DVB-S is the original Digital Video Broadcasting forward error coding and modulation standard for satellite television and dates back to 1995. It is used via satellites serving every continent of the world, including North America. DVB-S is used in both MCPC and SCPC modes for broadcast network feeds, as well as for direct broadcast satellite services like Sky and Freesat in the British Isles, Sky Deutschland and HD+ in Germany and Austria, TNT Sat/Fransat and CanalSat in France, Dish Network in the US, and Bell Satellite TV in Canada. The MPEG transport stream delivered by DVB-S is mandated as MPEG-2.

DVB-C stands for Digital Video Broadcasting - Cable and it is the DVB European consortium standard for the broadcast transmission of digital television over cable. This system transmits an MPEG-2 family digital audio/video stream, using a QAM modulation with channel coding.

=== ISDB ===
ISDB is very similar to DVB, however it is broken into 13 subchannels. Twelve are used for TV, while the last serves either as a guard band, or for the 1seg (ISDB-H) service. Like the other DTV systems, the ISDB types differ mainly in the modulations used, due to the requirements of different frequency bands. The 12 GHz band ISDB-S uses PSK modulation, 2.6 GHz band digital sound broadcasting uses CDM and ISDB-T (in VHF and/or UHF band) uses COFDM with PSK/QAM. It was developed in Japan with MPEG-2, and is now used in Brazil with MPEG-4. Unlike other digital broadcast systems, ISDB includes digital rights management to restrict recording of programming.

=== Comparison of digital terrestrial television systems ===
World television systems
System	Year ratified	Digital Modulation	Resolution (Lines)	Frame rate	Data rate	Hierarchical Mod.	Ch. B/W (MHz)	Video B/W	Audio offset	Video Coding	Audio Coding	Interactive TV	Digital subchannels	Single-Frequency Network	Predecessor format(s)	Mobile
ATSC 1.0		8VSB, A-VSB and E-VSB in the works	1080	Up to 60p	19.39 Mbit/s	No	6	4.25 digital carrier at 1.31 MHz	?	H.262	Dolby Digital, AC3, MPEG-1 Layer II	DSM-CC, MHEG-5, PSIP	Yes	Partial	NTSC	Not yet, ATSC-M/H in the works
ATSC 3.0	2016	COFDM (QPSK, 4096QAM)	2160p/4K	Up to 120p	57 Mbit/s	Yes	6	4.5	?	H.265/Scalable HEVC	Dolby AC-4, MPEG-H	Yes	Yes	Yes	NTSC, ATSC 1.0	Yes
DVB-T	1997	COFDM (QPSK, 16QAM/64QAM)	1080 (typical, not defined)	Up to 50p	Up to 31.668 Mbit/s	Yes	5, 6, 7, or 8	?	?	H.262, H.264	Dolby Digital, MPEG-1 Layer II, HE-AAC	DSM-CC, MHEG-5, DVB-SI	Yes	Yes	PAL, SECAM	Yes (DVB-H)
DVB-T2	2008	COFDM (QPSK, 16QAM, 64QAM, 256QAM)	1080 (typical, not defined)	Up to 50p	Up to 50.34 Mbit/s	Yes	1.7, 5, 6, 7, 8, or 10	?	?	H.262, H.264, H.265	Dolby Digital, MPEG-1 Layer II, HE-AAC	DSM-CC, MHEG-5, DVB-SI	Yes	Yes	DVB-T	DVB-NGH
DTMB	2006	TDS-OFDM	1080	Up to 50p	?	?	6, 7, or 8	?	?	MPEG-2, H.264/MPEG-4 AVC, AVS	MPEG-1 Audio Layer II, AC3, DRA	Yes	?	Yes	PAL	Yes
ISDB-T	1999	16/64QAM-OFDM (QPSK-OFDM/DQPSK-OFDM)	1080	Up to 60p	23 Mbit/s	Yes	6 (5.572 + 428 kHz guard band)	?	?	H.262; H.264 (1seg)	AAC	No	Yes	Yes	NTSC	Yes, ISDB-Tmm/1seg
ISDB-Tb (SBTVD)		BST-OFDM	1080	?	?	Yes	6	?	?	H.264	HE-AAC	Yes, Ginga	Yes	Yes	PAL-M, PAL-N, NTSC	Yes, 1seg
MediaFLO		OFDM (QPSK/16QAM)	?	?	?	?	5.55	?	?	?	?	Yes	?	?	NTSC (Channel 55)	Yes
T-DMB		OFDM-DQPSK	?	?	?	?	?	?	?	H.262/H.264	HE-AAC	?	?	?	NTSC	Yes

== Line count ==
As interlaced systems require accurate positioning of scanning lines, it is important to make sure that the horizontal and vertical timebase are in a precise ratio. This is accomplished by passing the one through a series of electronic divider circuits to produce the other. Each division is by a prime number.

Therefore, there has to be a straightforward mathematical relationship between the line and field frequencies, the latter being derived by dividing down from the former. Technology constraints of the 1930s meant that this division process could only be done using small integers, preferably no greater than 7, for good stability. The number of lines was odd because of 2:1 interlace. The 405 line system used a vertical frequency of 50 Hz (Standard AC mains supply frequency in Britain) and a horizontal one of 10,125 Hz (50 × 405 ÷ 2)

- 2 × 3 × 3 × 5 gives 90 lines (non interlaced)
- 2 × 2 × 2 × 2 × 2 × 3 gives 96 lines (non interlaced)
- 2 × 2 × 3 × 3 × 5 gives 180 lines (non interlaced) (used in Germany in mid-1930s before switch to 441-line system)
- 2 × 2 × 2 × 2 × 3 × 5 gives 240 lines (used for the experimental Baird transmissions in Britain [See Note 1])
- 3 × 3 × 3 × 3 × 3 gives 243 lines
- 7 × 7 × 7 gives 343 lines (early North American system also used in Poland and in Soviet Union before WW2)
- 3 × 5 × 5 × 5 gives 375 lines
- 3 × 3 × 3 × 3 × 5 gives 405 lines System A (used in Britain, Ireland and Hong Kong before 1985)
- 2 × 2 × 2 × 5 × 11 gives 440 lines (non interlaced)
- 3 × 3 × 7 × 7 gives 441 lines (used by RCA in North America before the 525-lines NTSC standard was adopted and widely used before WW2 in Continental Europe with different frame rates)
- 2 × 3 × 3 × 5 × 5 gives 450 lines (non interlaced)
- 5 × 7 × 13 gives 455 lines (used in France before WW2)
- 3 × 5 × 5 × 7 gives 525 lines System M (480i) (a compromise between the RCA and Philco systems. Still used today in most of the Americas and parts of Asia)
- 3 × 3 × 3 × 3 × 7 gives 567 lines (Developed by Philips used for a while in the late 1940s in the Netherlands)
- 5 × 11 × 11 gives 605 lines (proposed by Philco in North America before the 525 standard was adopted)
- 5 × 5 × 5 × 5 gives 625 lines (576i) (designed by Soviet engineers during the mid-late 1940s, introduced to Western Europe by German engineers.)
- 2 × 3 × 5 × 5 × 5 gives 750 lines at 50 frames (used for 720p50)
- 2 × 3 × 5 × 5 × 5 gives 750 lines at 60 frames (used for 720p60)
- 3 × 3 × 7 × 13 gives 819 lines (737i) (used in France in the 1950s)
- 3 × 7 × 7 × 7 gives 1,029 lines (proposed but never adopted around 1948 in France)
- 3 × 3 × 5 × 5 x 5 gives 1,125 lines at 25 frames (used for 1080i50 but not 1080p25)
- 3 × 3 × 5 × 5 x 5 gives 1,125 lines at 30 frames (used for 1080i60 but not 1080p30)

Notes

1. The division of the 240-line system is academic as the scan ratio was determined entirely by the construction of the mechanical scanning system used with the cameras used with this transmission system.
2. The division ratio though relevant to CRT-based systems is largely academic today because modern LCD and plasma displays are not constrained to having the scanning in precise ratios. The 1080p high definition system requires 1125 lines in a CRT display.
3. The System I version of the 625-line standard originally used 582 active lines before later changing to 576 in line with other 625-line systems.

== Conversion from one system to another system ==
Converting between different numbers of lines and different frequencies of fields/frames in video pictures is not an easy task. Perhaps the most technically challenging conversion to make is from any of the 625-line, 25-frame/s systems to system M, which has 525-lines at 29.97 frames per second. Historically this required a frame store to hold those parts of the picture not actually being output (since the scanning of any point was not time coincident). In more recent times, conversion of standards is a relatively easy task for a computer.

Aside from the line count being different, it's easy to see that generating 59.94 fields every second from a format that has only 50 fields might pose some interesting problems. Every second, an additional 10 fields must be generated seemingly from nothing. The conversion has to create new frames (from the existing input) in real time.

There are several methods used to do this, depending on the desired cost and conversion quality. The simplest possible converters simply drop every 5th line from every frame (when converting from 625 to 525) or duplicate every 4th line (when converting from 525 to 625), and then duplicate or drop some of those frames to make up the difference in frame rate. More complex systems include inter-field interpolation, adaptive interpolation, and phase correlation.

== See also ==
- Television antenna

Transmission technology standards

- Amateur television
- Broadcast safe
- Channel (broadcasting)
- Display resolution
- Lists of television channels for lists by country and language.
- Television channel frequencies
- Pan-American television frequencies
- European cable television frequencies
- Australian and New Zealand television frequencies

Defunct analog systems

- 405 lines
- 441 lines
- 819 lines
- MUSE an analog high-definition television system.

Analog television systems

- Intercarrier method
- NTSC (525/60)
- PAL (color encoding usually used with 625/50 systems)
- PAL-M
- PAL-N
- PALplus
- SECAM
- Transposers
- TV transmitters

Analog television system audio

- Multichannel Television Sound
- NICAM (digital, analog pre-emphasis curve)
- Zweikanalton
- The defunct MUSE system had a very unusual digital audio subsystem completely unrelated to NICAM.

Digital television systems

- HDTV systems all use MPEG transport technology
- ATSC standards
- DVB-T and DVB-T2
- ISDB and ISDB-T International (SBTVD)
- DTMB used in People's Republic of China, Hong Kong and Macau.

History

- History of television
- Oldest television station
- Television systems before 1940
