= Band I =

Radio wave frequency range

Band I is a range of radio frequencies within the very high frequency (VHF) part of the electromagnetic spectrum. The first time there was defined "for simplicity" in Annex 1 of "Final acts of the European Broadcasting Conference in the VHF and UHF bands - Stockholm, 1961". Band I ranges from 47 to 68 MHz for the European Broadcasting Area, and from 54 to 88 MHz for the Americas and it is primarily used for television broadcasting in compliance with ITU Radio Regulations (article 1.38). With the transition to digital TV, most Band I transmitters have already been switched off.

== Television broadcasting usage ==
Channel spacings vary from country to country, with spacings of 6, 7 and 8 MHz being common.

In the UK, Band I was originally used by the BBC for monochrome 405-line television; likewise, the French former 455-line (1937–1939) then 441-line (1943–1956) transmitter on the Eiffel Tower in Paris, and some stations of the French monochrome 819-line system used Band I. Both 405-line and 819-line systems were discontinued in the mid-1980s. Other European countries used Band I for 625-line analogue television, first in monochrome and later in colour.

This was being gradually phased out with the introduction of digital television in the DVB-T standard, which is not defined for VHF Band I, though some older receivers and some modulators do support it.

In the United States, use of this band is for analog NTSC (ended June 12, 2009 for high power stations) and digital ATSC (current). Digital television has problems with impulse noise interference, particularly in this band.

=== Europe ===
In European countries that used System B for television broadcasting, the band was subdivided into three main channels, E2, E3 and E4, each being 7 MHz wide.

Channel	Frequency range
E2	47-54 MHz
E2A	48.5-55.5 MHz
IA	52-59 MHz
E3	54-61 MHz
E4 / IB	61-68 MHz
IC (E4A)	81-88 MHz

E2A is a channel shifted slightly away from E2 and was used by a limited number of transmitters closer to Eastern Europe. Its use was to limit interference to and from nearby transmitters on channel R1.

Italy used slightly different allocations, such as channel IA and the out of band "channel IC" (video: 82.25 MHz - audio: 87.75 MHz). Channel IC was used by the first transmitter brought in service by the RAI in Turin in the 1950s which was previously used in WW2 by the US to broadcast NTSC TV on channel A6 for military purposes, later donated to Italy, it had its video carrier shifted 1 MHz lower to accommodate the System B standard. This channel was also widely used by private local stations until the switch over to DVB-T.

Some countries such as Ireland (system A, I), France (system E, F, L) and the United Kingdom (system A) did not use system B and therefore used different frequencies for their channels. Some others didn't use Band I at all for terrestrial broadcast television. The fast growing of digital television as well as the susceptibility of this band to interference during E skip events in all European countries was accompanied by the progressive closedown of band I analog transmitters from 2006 to 2020.

=== Russia and other former members of OIRT ===
In the countries that use System D television broadcast system, the channel allocation in the VHF-I band is as follows:

Channel	Frequency range
R1	48.5-56.5 MHz
R2	58-66 MHz

Russia, Ukraine, Kazakhstan and a few other countries still broadcast analog TV on Band I in 2023.

=== North America ===
The band is subdivided into five channels for television broadcasting, each occupying 6 MHz (System M). Channel 1 is not being used for broadcasting.

Channel	Frequency range
1*	44-50 MHz
A2	54-60 MHz
A3	60-66 MHz
A4	66-72 MHz
A5	76-82 MHz
A6	82-88 MHz

== FM radio usage ==
The upper end of this band, 87.5 to 88 MHz, is the lower end of the FM radio band. In the United States, the FCC will occasionally issue a license for 87.9 MHz (though it only does so on rare occurrences and special circumstances; KSFH was the most recent standalone station to use 87.9); 87.7 MHz, which is approximately the same frequency as the audio feed of channel A6, is used by some television licenses to broadcast primarily to radio, such as Pulse 87's stations. In Japan and some former Soviet republics frequencies lower than 87 MHz are still used for the FM broadcast band.

In Brazil, with the phasing out of the PAL-M analog broadcasts, AM radio stations have been migrated to a new FM radio band between the frequencies from former analog TV channels A5 and A6 (76.1 MHz to 87.5 MHz) called Extended FM or e-FM.

== Amateur radio and TV DX ==
The 6-meter band (50 MHz) and the 4-meter band (70 MHz) are used by radio amateurs. Short wave-like propagation is only possible under special circumstances, including frequent E skip events in the summer season. This leads to strong signals in the 800–2,000 km range allowing the reception of distant TV stations (TV DX). Worldwide connections are possible but remain a challenge on these frequencies.

== See also ==
- Television channel frequencies
