= CCIR System D =

625-line analog television transmission format

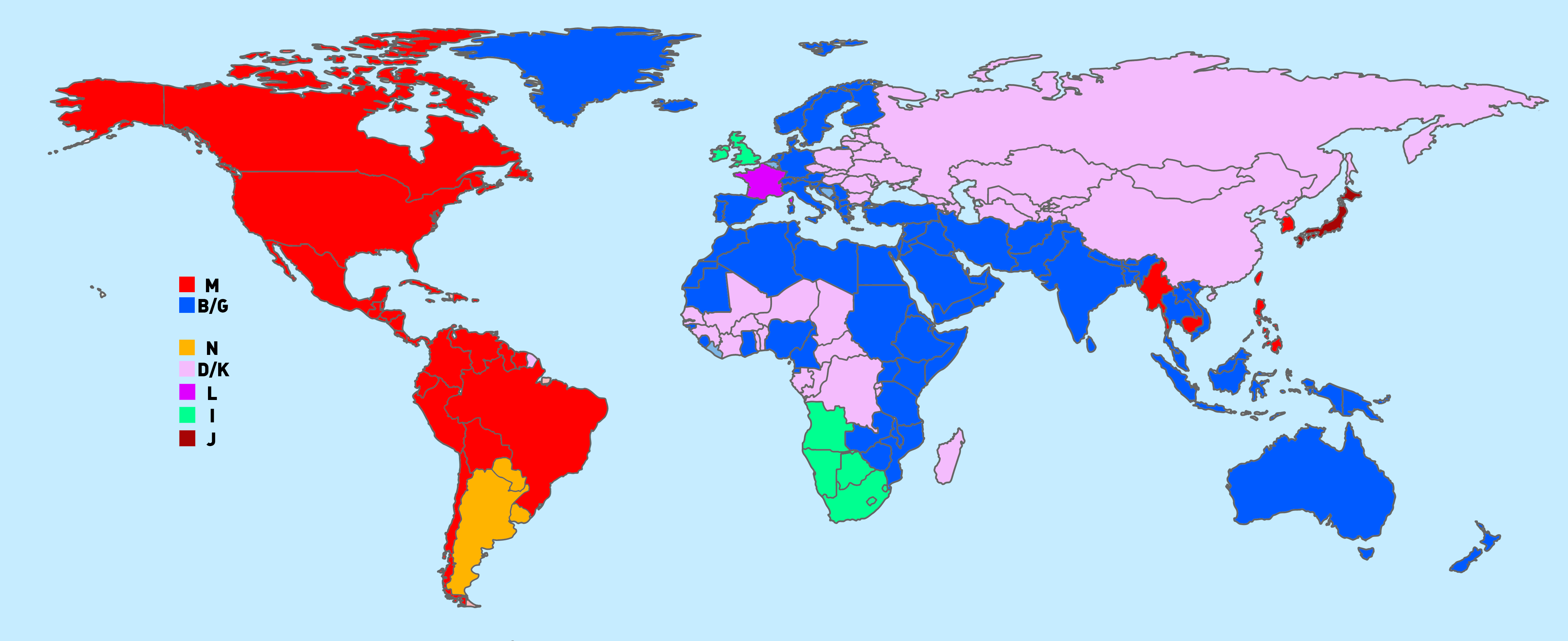
Analog TV systems global map, with System D in pink.

CCIR System D is an analog broadcast television system used in Bulgaria, Latvia, Lithuania, Poland, Romania, Slovakia, Czech Republic, Hungary, Albania, and the People's Republic of China, Mongolia, Kyrgyzstan, North Korea, Tajikistan, Turkmenistan, Uzbekistan, Armenia, Azerbaijan, Georgia, Kazakhstan, Moldova, Russia, Ukraine, and Belarus paired with the PAL/SECAM colour.

Initially known as the I.B.T.O. 625-line system this was the first 625-line system, developed by Mark Krivosheev in 1948, and later associated with the SECAM and PAL color systems. Used on VHF only in most countries, it usually combined with System K on UHF. In China, it is used for both VHF and UHF.

== Specifications ==
The general specifications for System D are listed below:

- Frame rate: 25 Hz
- Interlace: 2/1
- Field rate: 50 Hz
- Lines/frame: 625
- Line rate: 15.625 kHz
- Visual bandwidth: 6 MHz
- Vision modulation: Negative
- Preemphasis: 50 μs
- Sound modulation: FM
- Sound offset: +6.5 MHz
- Channel bandwidth: 8 MHz

Plan showing VHF frequency ranges for ITU Systems

Television channels were arranged as follows:

Original OIR assignments System D 625 lines
Channel	Video carrier (MHz)	Audio carrier (MHz)
I	41.75	48.25
II	49.75	56.25
III	59.25	65.75
IV	77.25	83.75
1	145.25	151.75
2	153.25	159.75
3	161.25	167.75
4	169.25	175.75
5	177.25	183.75
6	185.25	191.75
7	193.25	199.75
8	201.25	207.75
9	209.25	215.75

Assignments since 1965 System D 625 lines
Channel	Video carrier (MHz)	Audio carrier (MHz)
1	49.75	56.25
2	59.25	65.75
3	77.25	83.75
4	85.25	91.75
5	93.25	99.75
6	175.25	181.75
7	183.25	189.75
8	191.25	197.75
9	199.25	205.75
10	207.25	213.75
11	215.25	221.75
12	223.25	229.75

Channel arrangement for China (since 1970)
Channel	Frequency range (MHz)	Video carrier (MHz)	Audio carrier (MHz)	DTMB center frequency (MHz)
Band I
1	48.5 - 56.5	49.75	56.25	52.5
2	56.5 - 64.5	57.75	64.25	60.5
3	64.5 - 72.5	65.75	72.25	68.5
4	76 - 84	77.25	83.75	80
5	84 - 92	85.25	91.75	88
Band III
6	167 - 175	168.25	174.25	171
7	175 - 183	176.25	182.75	179
8	183 - 191	184.25	190.75	187
9	191 - 199	192.25	198.75	195
10	199 - 207	200.25	206.75	203
11	207 - 215	208.25	214.75	211
12	215 - 223	216.25	222.75	219

UHF System D arrangement for China
Ch	Video (MHz)	DTMB (MHz)	Audio (MHz)
13	471.25	474	477.75
14	479.25	482	485.75
15	487.25	490	493.75
16	495.25	498	501.75
17	503.25	506	509.75
18	511.25	514	517.75
19	519.25	522	525.75
20	527.25	530	533.75
21	535.25	538	541.75
22	543.25	546	549.75
23	551.25	554	557.75
24	559.25	562	565.75
25	605.25	610	611.75
26	613.25	618	619.75
27	621.25	626	627.75
28	629.25	634	635.75
29	637.25	642	643.75
30	645.25	650	651.75
31	653.25	658	659.75
32	661.25	666	667.75
33	669.25	674	675.75
34	677.25	682	683.75
35	685.25	690	691.75
36	693.25	698	699.75
37	701.25	706	707.75
38	709.25	714	715.75
39	717.25	722	723.75
40	725.25	730	731.75
41	733.25	738	739.75
42	741.25	746	747.75
43	749.25	754	755.75
44	757.25	762	763.75
45	765.25	770	771.75
46	773.25	778	779.75
47	781.25	786	787.75
48	789.25	794	795.75
49	797.25	802	803.75
50	805.25	810	811.75
51	813.25	818	819.75
52	821.25	826	827.75
53	829.25	834	835.75
54	837.25	842	843.75
55	845.25	850	851.75
56	853.25	858	859.75
57	861.25	866	867.75
58	871.25	874	877.75
59	879.25	882	885.75
60	887.25	890	893.75
61	895.25	898	901.75
62	903.25	906	909.75

- The original assignments of channels 25 to 57 were 2 MHz higher in frequency until c. 1984. Channels 58 to 62 were deleted at this time.

== See also ==
- Broadcast television systems
- Television transmitter
- Transposer
