= CCIR System M =

Analog broadcast television system

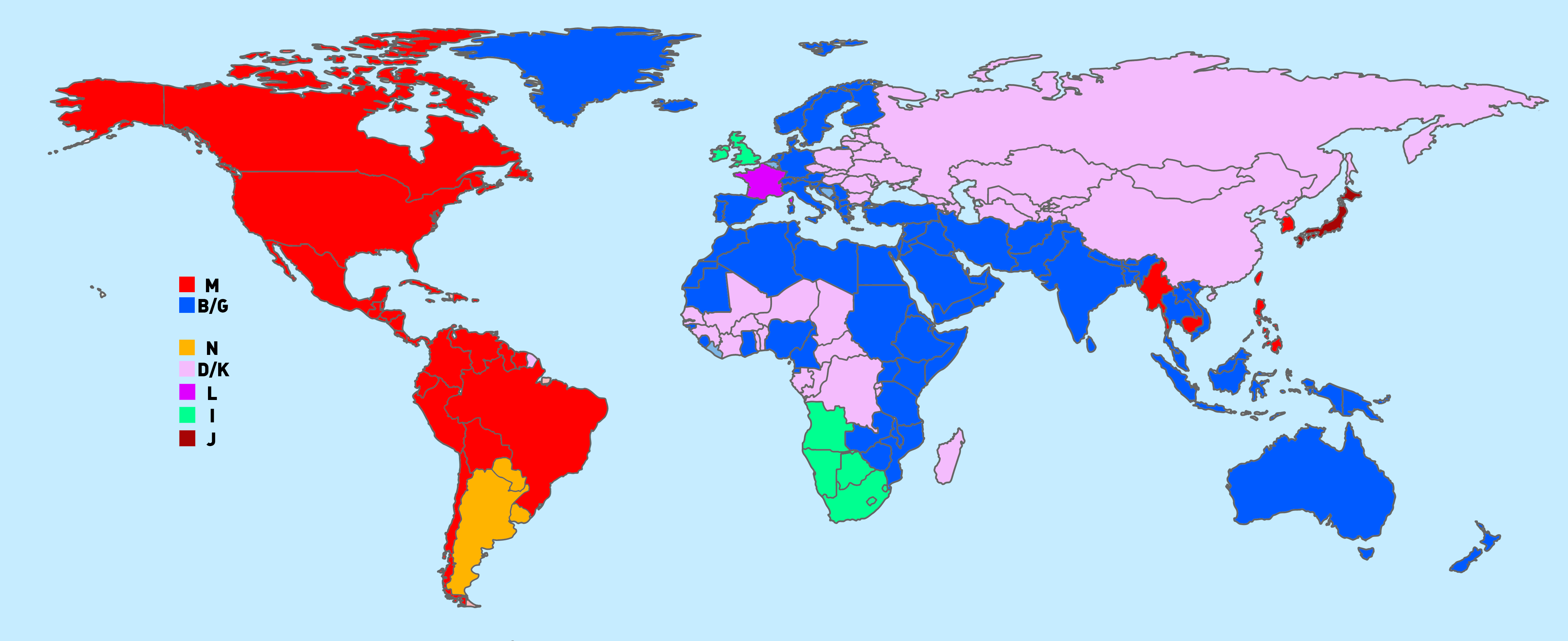
Analog TV systems global map, with System M in red.

CCIR System M, sometimes called 525–line, NTSC, NTSC-M, or CCIR-M, is the analog broadcast television system standardized by CCIR and approved by the FCC (upon recommendation by the National Television System Committee - NTSC) for use in the United States since July 1, 1941, replacing the 441-line TV system introduced in 1938. It is also known as EIA standard 170. System M comprises a total of 525 interlaced lines of video, of which 486 contain the image information, at 30 frames per second. Video is amplitude modulated and audio is frequency modulated, with a total bandwidth of 6 MHz for each channel, including a guard band.

It was also adopted in the Americas and Caribbean; Myanmar, Philippines, South Korea, Taiwan, Thailand, and Japan (here with minor differences, informally referred to as System J). System M doesn't specify a color system, but NTSC color encoding was normally used, with some exceptions: NTSC-J in Japan, PAL-M in Brazil and SECAM-M in Cambodia, Laos, and Vietnam (see Color standards section below).

The letter M designation was attributed by the ITU at the 1961 Stockholm meeting (see ITU identification scheme).

In 1965, Thailand decided to replace System M with the 625-line CCIR System B, which began implementation in 1967 and eventually adopted the PAL color standard.

Circa 2003, the transition from analog System M to digital television broadcasting began, and in 2009 the United States ended high power analog transmissions. Other nations such as Japan, South Korea, and Taiwan also transitioned to digital while the Philippines remain on analog transmissions with digital simulcasts.

== Specifications ==
Some of the important specifications for System M are listed below:

- Frame rate: 29.97 Hz (color), 30 Hz (monochrome)
- Field rate: 59.94 Hz (color), 60 Hz (monochrome)
- Lines (total): 525
- Lines (visible): 480
- Line rate: 15.734 kHz (color), 15.750 kHz (monochrome)
- Visual bandwidth: 4.2 MHz
- Vision modulation: Negative
- Preemphasis: 75 μs
- Sound modulation: FM
- Sound offset: +4.5 MHz
- Channel bandwidth: 6 MHz
- Vestigial sideband: 0.75 MHz
- Color standards: NTSC-M, NTSC-J, PAL-M, SECAM-M, Clear-Vision
Radio spectrum of a System M television channel with NTSC color

Plan showing VHF frequency ranges for ITU Systems

== Color standards ==
Television color encoding by nation: Brazil (PAL-M) and all green countries (NTSC) - except Japan - are based on monochrome System M.

=== NTSC-M and NTSC-J ===
Strictly speaking, System M does not designate how color is transmitted. However, in nearly every System M country, NTSC color encoding is used for color television. This combination is called NTSC-M, but usually simply referred to as "NTSC", because of the relative lack of importance of black-and-white television. In NTSC-M and Japan's NTSC-J, the frame rate is offset slightly, becoming 30/1.001 frames per second, usually labeled as the rounded number 29.97.

=== PAL-M ===
The main exception to System M's being paired with NTSC color is Brazil, where PAL color is used instead, resulting in the PAL-M combination unique to that country. It is monochrome-compatible with other System M countries, but not compatible with other PAL countries, which use 625-line based systems.

=== SECAM-M ===
Between 1970 and 1991 a variation of the SECAM color system, known as SECAM-M, was used in Cambodia, Laos, and Vietnam (Hanoi and other northern cities).

=== Clear-Vision ===
Clear-Vision is a Japanese EDTV (Extended Definition TV) television system introduced in the 1990s, that improves audio and video quality while remaining compatible with the existing System M broadcast standard. Developed to improve analog NTSC, it adds features like progressive scan, ghost cancellation and widescreen image format.

== See also ==
- NTSC — dominant color system used with System M, so much so that System M is often referred to as "NTSC". Much of the information in the NTSC article is actually about System M.
- Broadcast television systems — explains other types of television system standards
- Multichannel Television Sound — usual method for adding stereo to System M and System N audio carriers
- Pan-American television frequencies
