= PAL-M =

Brazilian analog color television broadcast standard

Analog television encoding systems by nation (at time of digital switchover, where applicable): NTSC SECAM PAL No info

PAL-M was the analog color TV system used in Brazil since 19 February 1972, making it the first South American country to broadcast in color.

It is unique among analog TV systems in that it combines the 525-line, 29.97 frames-per-second System M with the PAL color encoding system (using very nearly the NTSC color subcarrier frequency), unlike all other countries which pair PAL and SECAM with 625-line systems and NTSC with 525-line systems.

Color broadcasts began on 19 February 1972, when a TV station in Caxias do Sul, TV Difusora, transmitted the Caxias do Sul Grape Festival in collaboration with TV Rio. Transition from black and white to color on most programs was not complete until 1978, and only became commonplace nationwide by 1980.

== Origins ==
NTSC being the "natural" choice for countries with monochrome standard M, the choice of a different color system poses problems of incompatibility with available hardware and the need to develop new television sets and production hardware. Walter Bruch, inventor of PAL, explains Brazil's choice of PAL over NTSC against these odds by an advertising campaign Telefunken and Philips carried out across South America in 1972, which included color test broadcasts of popular shows (done with TV Globo) and technical demonstrations with executives of television stations.

== Technical specifications ==
PAL-M signals are in general identical to North American NTSC signals, except for the encoding of the color carrier. Both systems are based on the monochrome CCIR System M standard, therefore, PAL-M will display in monochrome with sound on an NTSC set and vice versa. Nevertheless, due to the different gamma correction values (2.2 for NTSC, 2.8 for PAL-M), gray tones will be incorrect.

PAL-M is incompatible with 625-line based versions of PAL, because its frame rate, scan line, color subcarrier and sound carrier specifications are different. It will therefore usually give a rolling and/or squashed monochrome picture with no sound on a native European PAL television, as do NTSC signals.

PAL-M details:

- Transmission band: VHF/UHF
- Frame rate: 30/1.001 Hz ≈ 29.97 Hz
- Field rate: 60/1.001 Hz ≈ 59.94 Hz
- Scan lines: 525
- Active lines: 480
- Channel bandwidth: 6 MHz
- Video bandwidth: 4.2 MHz
- Vision/sound carrier spacing: 4.5 MHz
- Color subcarrier: 8181/2288 MHz ≈ 3.575611 MHz
- Assumed receiver gamma: 2.8
- Color model: YUV

PAL-M colorimetry:

Colorimetry is indicated on BT.470-6 and similar to the original 1953 color NTSC specification:

Standard	White point		CCT	Primary colors (CIE 1931 xy)						Display gamma EOTF
Standard	x	y	k	R_{x}	R_{y}	G_{x}	G_{y}	B_{x}	B_{y}	Display gamma EOTF
ITU-R BT.470-6	0.31	0.316	6774 (C)	0.67	0.33	0.21	0.71	0.14	0.08	2.8

Note: displayed colors are approximate and require a wide gamut display for faithful reproduction.

=== PAL-M systems conversion issues ===
PAL-M being a standard unique to one country, the need to convert it to/from other standards often arises.

- Conversion to/from NTSC is easy, as only the color carrier needs to be changed. Frame rate and scan lines can remain untouched.
- Conversion to/from PAL/625 lines/25 frame/s and SECAM/625/25 signals involves changing the frame rates as well as the scan lines. This is achieved using complicated circuitry involving a digital frame store, the same method used for converting between NTSC and the 625/25 standards. The fact that the color encoding of PAL-M and PAL/625/25 is the same does not help, as the entire signal goes through an A/D-D/A conversion process anyway.

However some special VHS video recorders are available which can allow viewers the flexibility of enjoying PAL-M recordings using a standard PAL (625/50 Hz) color TV, or even through multi-system TV sets. Video recorders like Panasonic NV-W1E (AG-W1 for the USA), AG-W2, AG-W3, NV-J700AM, Aiwa HV-MX100, HV-MX1U, Samsung SV-4000W and SV-7000W feature a digital TV system conversion circuitry. Some recorders support the other way around, being able to playback standard PAL (625/50 Hz) in 50 Hz-compatible PAL-M TV sets, such as the Panasonic NV-FJ605.

=== PAL 60 ===
The PAL color system (either baseband or with any RF system, with the normal 4.43 MHz subcarrier unlike PAL-M) can also be applied to an NTSC-like 525-line picture to form what is often known as "PAL-60" (sometimes "PAL-60/525," "Pseudo-PAL," or "Quasi-PAL"). This non-standard signal is a method used in European domestic VCRs and DVD players for playback of NTSC material on PAL televisions. It's not identical to PAL-M and incompatible with it, because the color subcarrier is at a different frequency; it will therefore display in monochrome on PAL-M and NTSC television sets.

== Technological obsolescence ==
=== SBTVD and ABERT/SET tests ===
The analog PAL-M was scheduled to be supplanted by a digital high-definition system named Sistema Brasileiro de Televisão Digital (SBTVD) by 2015, and finishing in 2018. From 1999 to 2000, the ABERT/SET group in Brazil did system comparison tests of ATSC, DVB-T, and ISDB-T under the supervision of the CPqD foundation.

Originally, Brazil including Argentina, Paraguay, and Uruguay planned to adopt the DVB-T standard. However, the ABERT/SET group selected ISDB-T, after field-tests results showed that it was the most robust system under Brazilian reception conditions. Therefore, SBTVD was replaced by the Brazilian variant of the ISDB standard, ISDB-Tb, which features SBTVD's characteristics into the originally-Japanese digital norm.

== See also ==
- Broadcast television systems
