= Television transmitter =

Device for broadcasting television signals

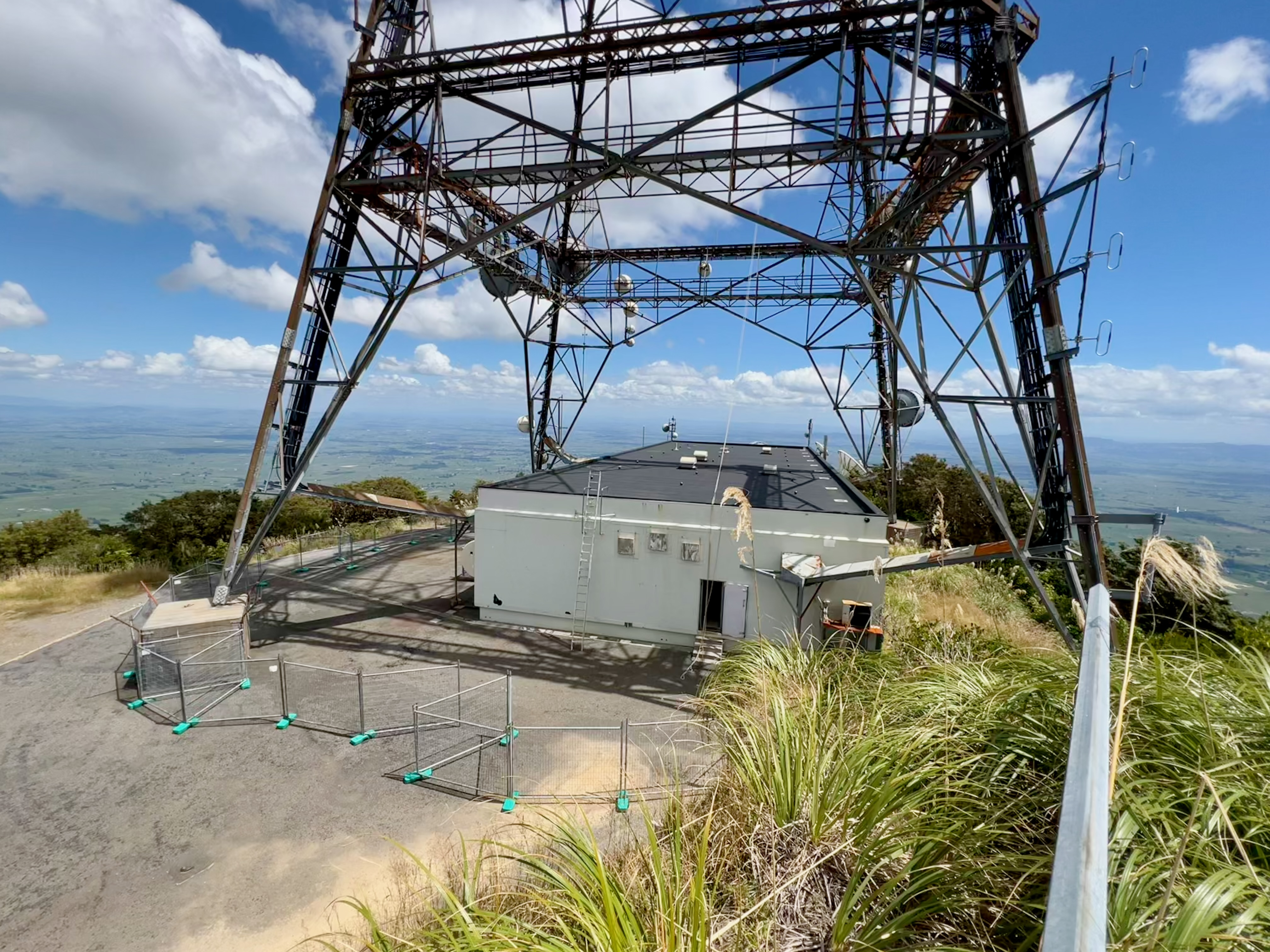
Television transmitter for Freeview in New Zealand

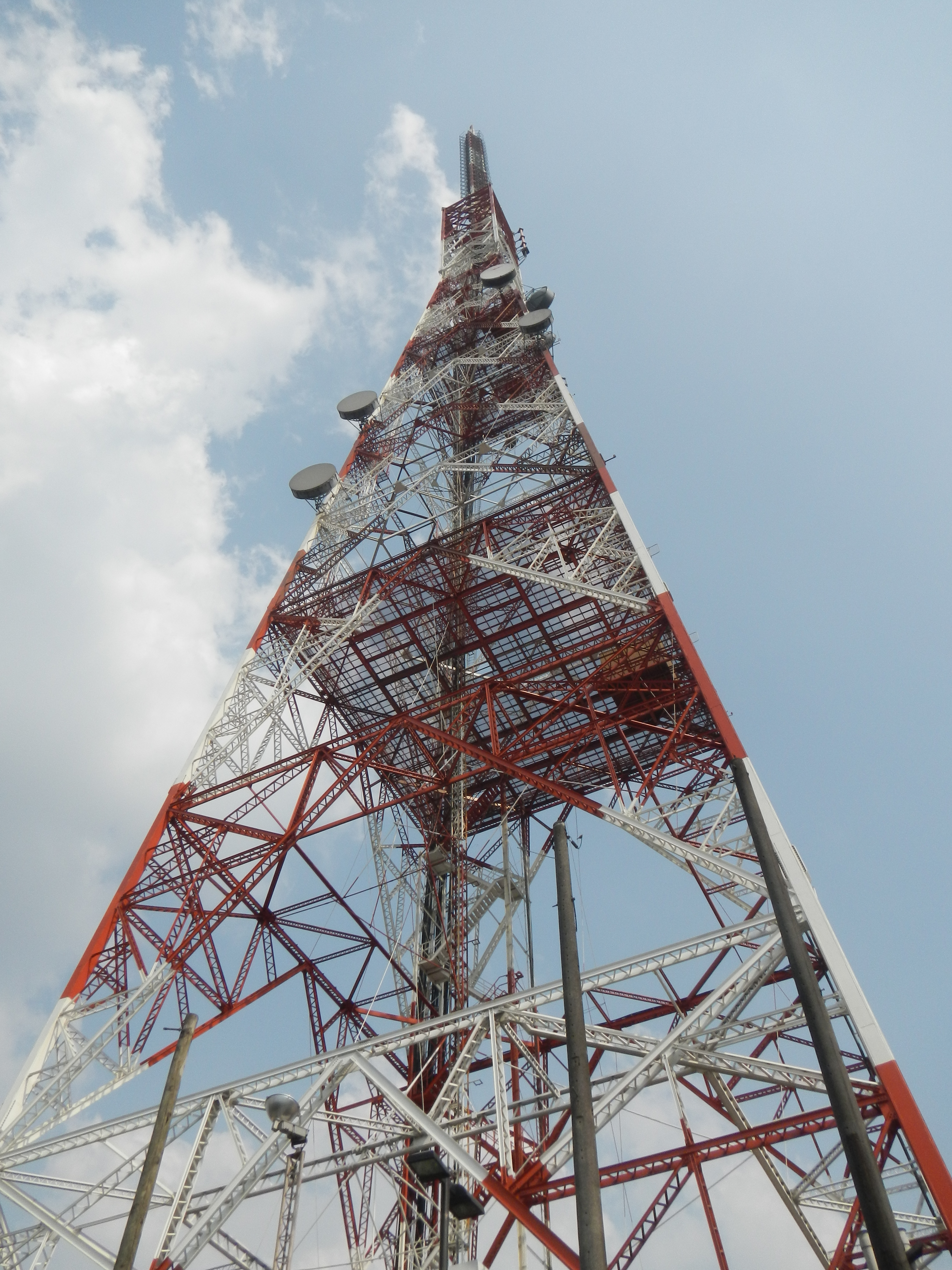
Television transmitter for ABS-CBN sa ALLTV2 in the Philippines.

A television transmitter is a transmitter that is used for terrestrial (over-the-air) television broadcasting. It is an electronic device that radiates radio waves that carry a video signal representing moving images, along with a synchronized audio channel, which is received by television receivers ('televisions' or 'TVs') belonging to a public audience, which display the image on a screen. A television transmitter, together with the broadcast studio which originates the content, is called a television station. Television transmitters must be licensed by governments, and are restricted to a certain frequency channel and power level. They transmit on frequency channels in the VHF and UHF bands. Since radio waves of these frequencies travel by line of sight, they are limited by the horizon to reception distances of 40–60 miles depending on the height of transmitter station.

Television transmitters use one of two different technologies: analog, in which the picture and sound are transmitted by analog signals modulated onto the radio carrier wave, and digital in which the picture and sound are transmitted by digital signals. The original television technology, analog television, began to be replaced in a transition beginning in 2006 in many countries with digital television (DTV) systems. These transmit pictures in a new format called HDTV (high-definition television) which has higher resolution and a wider screen aspect ratio than analog. DTV makes more efficient use of scarce radio spectrum bandwidth, as several DTV channels can be transmitted in the same bandwidth as a single analog channel. In both analog and digital television, different countries use several incompatible modulation standards to add the video and audio signals to the radio carrier wave.

The principles of primarily analog systems are summarized as they are typically more complex than digital transmitters due to the multiplexing of VSB and FM modulation stages.

== Types of transmitters ==
There are many types of transmitters depending on

- The system standard
- Output power
- Back up facility, usually the Modulator, Multiplexer and Power Amplifier
- Stereophonic (or dual sound) facility, for analogue TV systems
- Aural and visual power combining principal, for analogue TV systems
- Active circuit element in the final amplifier stage

== The system standard ==
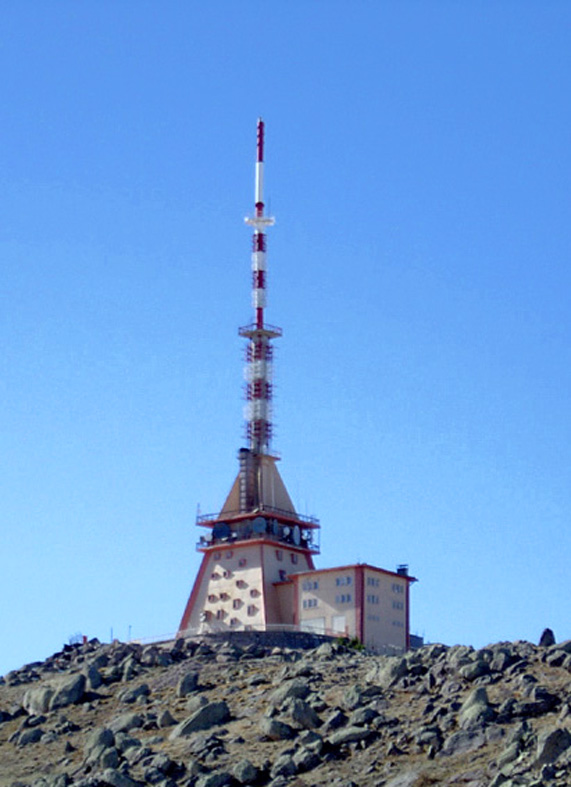
A typical television transmitter and antenna at Karadağ, Karaman, Turkey

An international plan by ITU (International Telecommunication Union) on broadcast standards which is usually known as Stockholm plan (1961) defines standards used in broadcasting. In this plan, most important figures for transmitters are radio frequency, frequency separation between aural and visual carriers and band width.

== Input stage of a transmitter ==
The audio (AF) input (or inputs in case of stereophonic broadcasting) is usually a signal with 15 kHz maximum bandwidth and 0 dBm maximum level. Preemphasis time constant is 50 μs. The signal after passing buffer stages is applied to a modulator, where it modulates an intermediate frequency carrier (IF). The modulation technique is usually frequency modulation (FM) with a typical maximum deviation of 50 kHz (for 1 kHz. input at 0 dBm level).

The video (VF) input is a composite video signal (video information with sync) of maximum 1 volt on 75 Ω impedance. (1 V limit is for luminance signal. Some operators may accept superimposed color signals slightly over 1 V.) After buffer and 1 V clipping circuits, the signal is applied to the modulator where it modulates an intermediate frequency signal (which is different from the one used for aural signal.) The modulator is an amplitude modulator which modulates the IF signal in a manner where 1 V VF corresponds to low level IF and 0 volt VF corresponds to high level IF. AM modulator produces two symmetrical side bands in the modulated signals. Thus, IF band width is two times the video band width. (i.e. if the VF bandwidth is 4.2 MHz, the IF bandwidth is 8.4 MHz.) However, the modulator is followed by a special filter known as Vestigal sideband (VSB) filter. This filter is used to suppress a portion of one side band, thus bandwidth is reduced. (Since both side bands contain identical information, this suppression doesn't cause a loss in information.) Although the suppression causes phase delay problems the VSB stage also includes correction circuits to equalise the phase.

== Output stages ==
The modulated signal is applied to a mixer (also known as frequency converter). Another input to the mixer which is usually produced in a crystal oven oscillator is known as subcarrier. The two outputs of the mixer are the sum and difference of two signals. Unwanted signal (usually the sum) is filtered out and the remaining signal is the radio frequency (RF) signal. Then the signal is applied to the amplifier stages. The number of series amplifiers depends on the required output power. The final stage is usually an amplifier consisting of many parallel power transistors. But in older transmitters tetrodes or klystrons are also utilized.

In modern solid-state VHF and UHF transmitters, LDMOS power transistors are the device of choice for the output stage, with the latest products employing 50V LDMOS devices for higher efficiency and power density. Even higher energy efficiency is possible using Envelope Tracking, which in the broadcast industry is often referred to as 'drain modulation'.

== Combining aural and visual signals ==
There are two methods:

- Split sound system: There are two parallel transmitters, one for aural signal and one for visual signal. The signals are mixed and amplified before being combined at the output via a high power combiner. This is the system used in most high power applications.

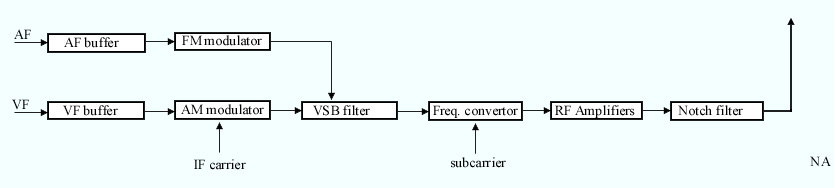

- Intercarrier system: There are two input stages, one for AF and one for VF respectively. The two signals are combined in low power IF circuits (i.e., after modulators). Because the mixer and amplifiers are common to both signals, the system needs no high power combiners and therefore the price and power consumption is considerably lower than that of split sound system of the same operational level. An adverse effect of the two signals passing through amplifiers is intermodulation products, so the intercarrier system is not suitable for high power applications. In the case of lower power transmitters, a notch filter to reject the cross modulation products must be used at the output.

== Output power ==
The output power of the transmitter is defined as the power during sync pulse (Real output power is variable depending on the content). The quantifiable power from the transmitting equipment and antenna are different from one another. The output power of the antenna is known as ERP, which is represented by the formula

$P_A=P_0\cdot G_A$

where P_{o} represents output power, and G_{a} represents antenna gain.

== See also ==
- Amplitude modulation
- Asynchronous serial interface
- Broadcast relay station
- Broadcast television systems
- Differential gain
- Differential phase
- Inductive output tube
- Intercarrier method
- Studio/transmitter link (STL)
- Transmitter
- Transmitter/studio link (TSL)
- Transmitter station
- Transposer
