= Outline of television broadcasting =

Overview of and topical guide to television broadcasting

The following outline is provided as an overview of and topical guide to television broadcasting:

Television broadcasting: form of broadcasting in which a television signal is transmitted by radio waves from a terrestrial (Earth based) transmitter of a television station to TV receivers having an antenna.

== Nature of television broadcasting ==
Television broadcasting can be described as all of the following:

- Technology
- Electronics technology
- Telecommunication technology
- Broadcasting technology

== Types of television broadcasting ==
- Terrestrial television
- Closed-circuit television
- Outside broadcasting
- Direct broadcast satellite (DBS)

== History of television broadcasting ==
- History of television

== Television broadcasting technology ==
=== Infrastructure and broadcasting system ===
- Television
- Television set
  - List of television manufacturers
- Satellite television
- TV broadcast
- Microwave link
- Television receive-only
- Television transmitter
- Transposer
- Transmitter station
- Television channels
- TV station
- Television studio
- Terrestrial frequency or virtual number
- Broadcast programming
- Television shows
  - Lists of television shows
- Over the top media service
- Video on demand
- Digital television
- List of broadcasting terms
- Streaming media
- Streaming television

=== System standards ===
- System A the 405 line system
- 441 line system
- Broadcast television systems
- System B
- System G
- System H
- System I
- System M
- Terrestrial television

=== Television signals ===
==== Video signal ====
- Analogue television synchronization
- Back porch
- Black level
- Blanking level
- Chrominance
- Composite video
- Frame (video)
- Front porch
- Horizontal blanking interval
- Horizontal scan rate
- Luma (video)
- Overscan
- Raster scan
- Television lines
- White clipper
- Vertical blanking interval
- VF bandwidth
- VIT signals

==== The sound signal ====
- Multichannel television sound
- NICAM
- Pre-emphasis
- Sound in syncs
- Zweikanalton

==== Broadcast signal ====
- Beam tilt
- Downlink CNR
- Earth bulge
- Frequency offset
- Field strength in free space
- Knife-edge effect
- Null fill
- Output power of an analog TV transmitter
- Path loss
- Radio propagation
- Radiation pattern
- Skew
- Television interference

===== Modulation and frequency conversion =====
- Amplitude modulation
- Frequency mixer
- Frequency modulation
- Quadrature amplitude modulation
- Vestigial sideband modulation (VSBF)

===== IF and RF signal =====
- Differential gain
- Differential phase
- Distortion
- Group delay and phase delay
- Intercarrier method
- Intermediate frequency
- Noise (electronics)
- Radio frequency
- Residual carrier
- Split sound system
- Superheterodyne transmitter
- Television channel frequencies
- Ultra high frequency
- Very high frequency
- Zero reference pulse

=== Color TV ===
- Color burst
- Color killer
- Color television
- Dot crawl
- Hanover bars
- NTSC
- PAL
- PAL-M
- PALplus
- PAL-S
- SECAM

=== Stages and output equipment ===
- Amplifier
- Antenna (radio)
- Cavity amplifier
- Diplexer
- Dipole antenna
- Dummy load
- Electronic filter
- Tetrode
- Klystron

=== Measuring instruments ===
- Distortionmeter
- Field strength meter
- Oscilloscope
- Multimeter
- Network analyzer
- Psophometer
- Vectorscope

== Television broadcasting by country ==
- Television in Afghanistan
- Television in Albania
- Television in Algeria
- Television in Andorra
- Television in Angola
- Television in Argentina
- Television in Australia
- Television in Austria
- Television in Azerbaijan
- Television in Bangladesh
- Television in Barbados
- Television in Belarus
- Television in Belgium
- Television in Bermuda
- Television in Bosnia and Herzegovina
- Television in Brazil
- Television in Bulgaria
- Television in Burma
- Television in Burundi
- Television in Canada
- Television in Chile
- Television in China
- Television in Colombia
- Television in Croatia
- Television in Cuba
- Television in Cyprus
- Television in the Czech Republic
- Television in Denmark
- Television in Ecuador
- Television in Egypt
- Television in Estonia
- Television in Ethiopia
- Television in Finland
- Television in France
- Television in the Faroe Islands
- Television in Georgia
- Television in Germany
- Television in Greece
- Television in Honduras
- Television in Hong Kong
- Television in Hungary
- Television in Iceland
- Television in India
- Television in Indonesia
- Television in Iraq
- Television in Ireland
- Television in Israel
- Television in Italy
- Television in Jamaica
- Television in Japan
- Television in Kyrgyzstan
- Television in Latvia
- Television in Lebanon
- Television in Libya
- Television in Liechtenstein
- Television in Lithuania
- Television in the Isle of Man
- Television in Malaysia
- Television in Mali
- Television in Malta
- Television in Mauritania
- Television in Mexico
- Television in Moldova
- Television in Monaco
- Television in Montenegro
- Television in Morocco
- Television in Mozambique
- Television in Myanmar
- Television in Nauru
- Television in the Netherlands
- Television in New Zealand
- Television in North Korea
- Television in North Macedonia
- Television in Norway
- Television in Pakistan
- Television in Peru
- Television in the Philippines
- Television in Poland
- Television in Portugal
- Television in Romania
- Television in Russia
- Television in San Marino
- Television in Saudi Arabia
- Television in Scotland
- Television in Senegal
- Television in Serbia
- Television in Singapore
- Television in Slovakia
- Television in Slovenia
- Television in South Africa
- Television in South Korea
- Television in South Sudan
- Television in Spain
- Television in Sri Lanka
- Television in Sudan
- Television in Sweden
- Television in Switzerland
- Television in Taiwan
- Television in Thailand
- Television in Trinidad and Tobago
- Television in Tunisia
- Television in Turkey
- Television in Ukraine
- Television in the United Kingdom
- Television in the United States
- Television in Uruguay
- Television in Venezuela
- Television in Vietnam
- Television in Western Sahara
- Television in Yemen

== See also ==
- Outline of communication
- Outline of culture
- Outline of dance
- Outline of entertainment
- Outline of film
- Outline of games
- Outline of human sexuality
- Outline of the Internet
- Outline of literature
- Outline of music
- Outline of performing arts
- Outline of photography
- Outline of radio
- Outline of sports
- Outline of telecommunication
- Outline of theatre
- Outline of video games
- Outline of the visual arts
