= Telefunken FuBK =

Electronic analogue television test card

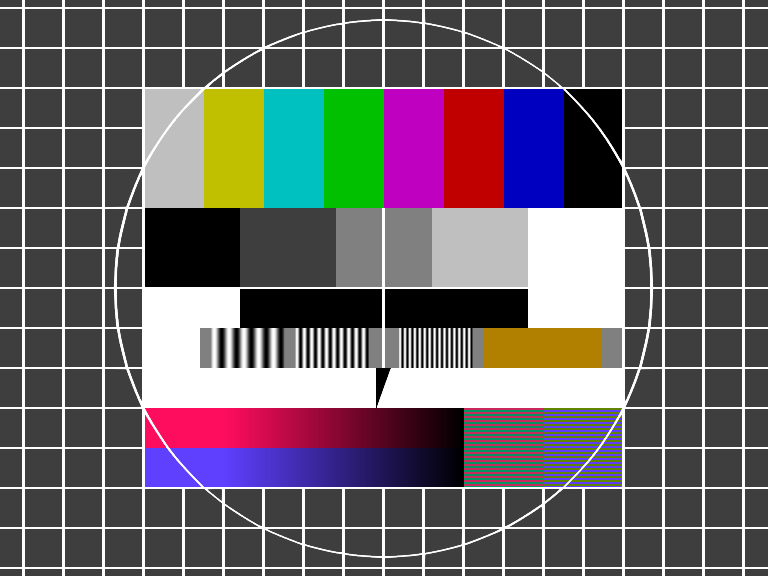
Recreation of the Telefunken FuBK test card

The Telefunken FuBK (from the German Funkbetriebskommission for "Television Service Commission") is an electronic analogue television test card developed by AEG-Telefunken and Bosch Fernseh in West Germany as the successor to the monochrome T05 test card in the late-1960s and used with analogue 625-lines PAL broadcasts.

Not as popular as the Philips PM5544, nevertheless it saw widespread use in West Germany (and later reunified Germany) and some other European, Asian, South American and African countries, and by a few commercial TV stations in Australia.

== Physical equipment ==
The test card was generated electronically by several video-signal generators, including two variations of the Philips PM5644 generator (PM5644G/50 {PAL B/G} and PM5644G/70 {YCbCr}) and the Rohde & Schwarz SGPF-B3 (the Grundig VG 1001 test signal generator has a different pattern design, but is sometimes indicated as "FuBk" because it features similar test elements). It has also been used in conjunction with digital broadcasts by means of the PT5300 from ProTeleVision/DK Technologies.

== Test card features ==
Some elements present on the FuBK test card are:

- Cross hatch - makes up the background of the table, with 19x15 white lines over a dark gray (25% luminance) background, allowing adjustment of CRT convergence and focus;
- Circle - provide a way to correct vertical and horizontal raster scan geometrical distortions;
- Colour bars - EBU colour bars at 75% luminance (75/0/75/0) to adjust colour saturation and purity
- Grey staircase - five bars (0%, 25%, 50%, 75%, 100%) that allow setting brightness, linearity and contrast control
- 2T convergence cross - check for signal reflections and group delay, help with geometrical image centring
- Multiburst- four grating with sine curves at 1, 2, 3 and 4.433 MHz, as a test of horizontal resolution
- Black section- check for reflections, transient response and group delay
- ±V/ +U ramp - two lines that allow checking PAL decoder linearity with UV signals
- +V/ ±U anti PAL - two achromatic fields to test the PAL decoder delay line

On PAL broadcasts, with a maximum displayable video bandwidth of around 5 MHz, individual lines should just be visible in all Multiburst gratings. In other situations, like a VHS recording with reduced bandwidth, they become more and more indistinct, merging into a grey area.

The two special achromatic fields should be displayed as grey if PAL decoding is functioning correctly. If not, colour will be seen on these areas, as shown in the off-air screen capture of ARD Das Erste test card, visible on the "Usage Gallery" at the end of this article.

=== Variations ===
==== 4:3 ====
- A variation (used by Doordarshan in India, by PTT-NL/Nozema/NOS in the Netherlands, TVR in Romania, YLE in Finland, Sky One in the United Kingdom and in West Germany) simply omitted the centre circle. This variation is also anecdotally called "Simplified FuBK".
- Another variation adds a second set of colour bars (replacing the ±V/ +U Ramp and +V/ ±U Anti PAL sections) and flips the middle downward triangle. This was used by IRIB in Iran.
- Another variation that adds border castellations and changes the middle downward triangle to a simple vertical bar, used by Kanal 2 in Denmark, Rupavahini in Sri Lanka, Televerket Kabel-TV in Sweden and on some German channels. Used with further modifications and added graphics by al-Jamahiriya TV (Libya).
- Another modification, again omitting the circle but including a grid cross in the middle and slightly different resolution gratings, was known to be used on some TV transmitters in Belgium and the Netherlands.
- A monochrome variant, omitting the centre circle and replacing the colour bars with a black box showing the transmitter name and channel, as well as an on-screen line gauge replacing the ±V/ +U Ramp and +V/ ±U Anti PAL sections near the bottom, was used on some DBP-operated TV transmitters in West Germany in the 1970s.
- While not exactly a variant, the Grundig VG 1001 pattern features many of the FuBK test elements, like the colour and grey bars, PAL check area and gratings. This allows it to be used to perform the same adjustments. This pattern was used by a few channels like BRT (Flemish Community of Belgium), SDR (southwest Germany), Polsat (Poland), MVQ-6 (Mackay Region, QLD, Australia), at the headends of many Finnish cable TV providers, on experimental satellite test transmissions involving the Orbital Test Satellite in the early-1980s, as well as on point-to-point cable and satellite feeds in the UK, France, Austria, Italy, Germany, Luxembourg and Belgium. A heavily modified version of the VG 1001 pattern was used for SECAM transmissions by Bulgarian National Television (BNT) during People's Republic of Bulgaria era and also later in PAL by NOVA from its launch in 1994.

==== 16:9 ====
In the 1990s, a FuBK variant in the 16:9 aspect ratio format was developed for the PALplus and (HD-)MAC standards and was used by some channels such as ARD. Crosshatch was changed to a 25x15 grid, and geometric markings for the central 4:3 safe area were included, with the other details being generally the same as on the original version. This pattern could be generated by the Grundig VG 1100 video generator, introduced around 1995 as well as the PM5644/86 and the digital PT5300 from DK Technologies (with an optional hardware upgrade).

==== Variation Gallery ====
Recreation of the FuBK test card, omitting anti-PAL lines.

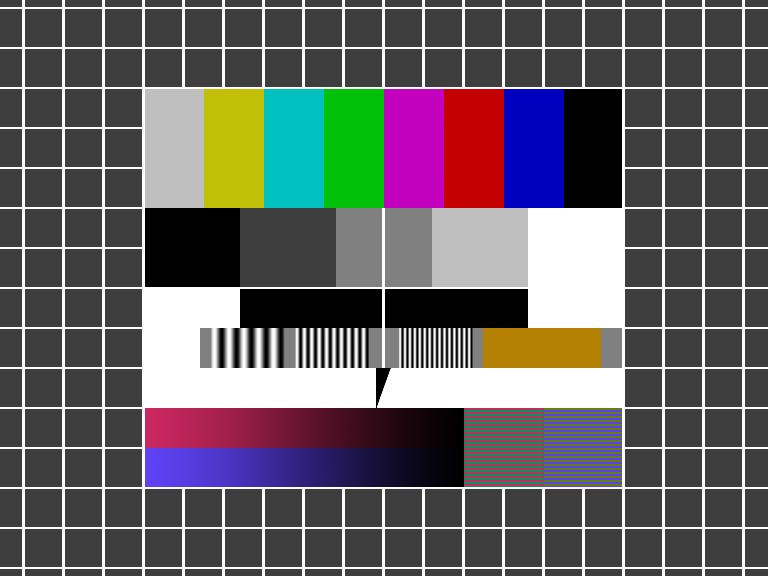
Recreation of the FuBK square variant omitting the centre circle. ("Simplified FuBK")

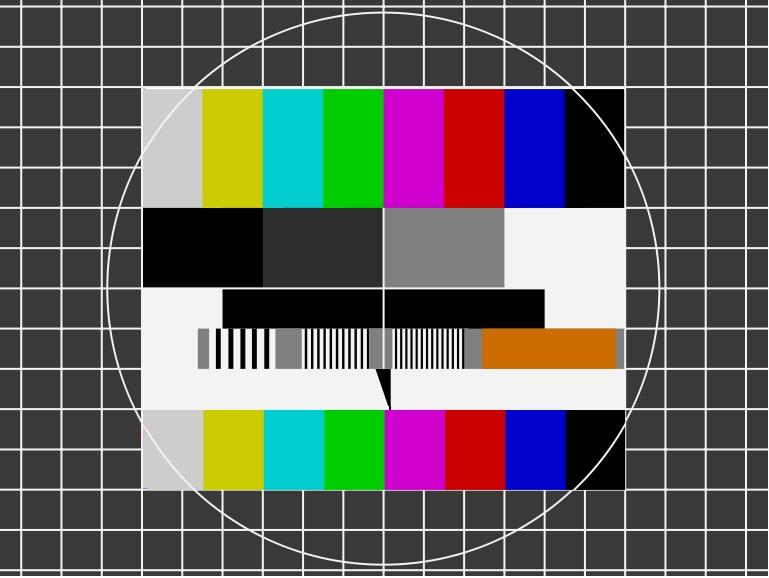
Recreation of the modified FuBK test card used by IRIB.

Recreation of the FuBK test card variation that adds border castellations and changes the middle downward triangle to a simple vertical bar.

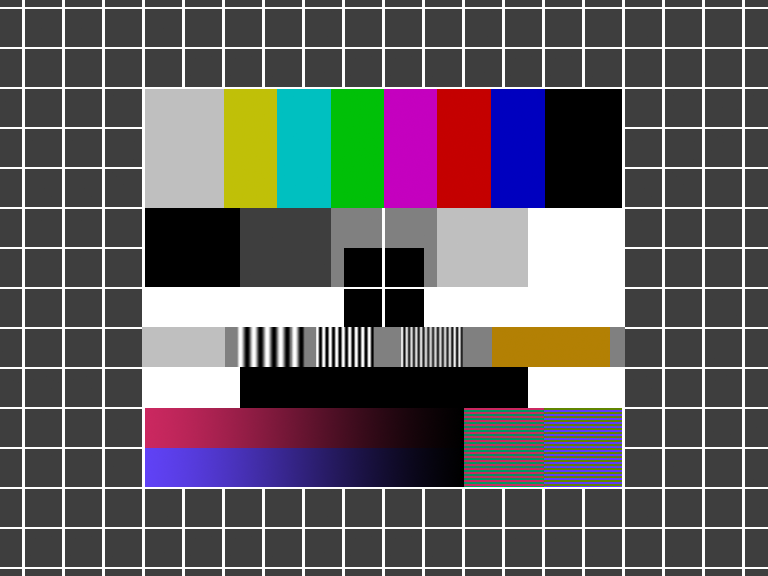
Recreation of the Telefunken FuBK test card square variation omitting the circle, including a grid cross in the middle, and with slightly different gratings.

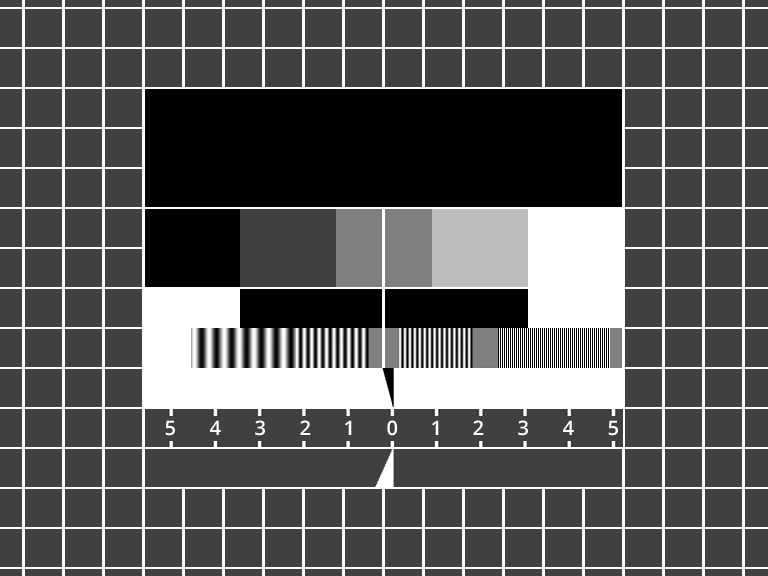
Recreation of the FuBK monochrome variant, omitting the centre circle and replacing the colour bars with a black box showing the transmitter name and channel, as well as an on-screen line gauge replacing the ±V/ +U Ramp and +V/ ±U Anti PAL sections near the bottom.

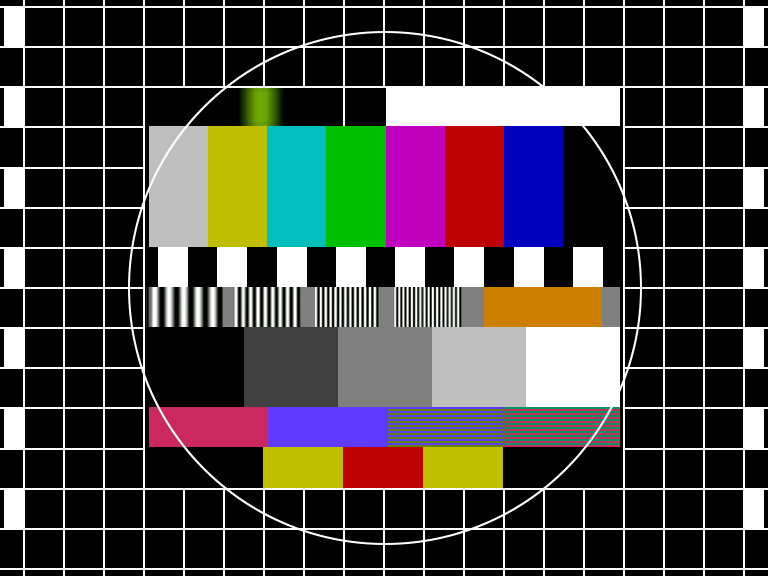
Recreation of the Grundig VG 1001 pattern, featuring similar elements to FuBK. (Polsat's version sometimes omitted the circle)

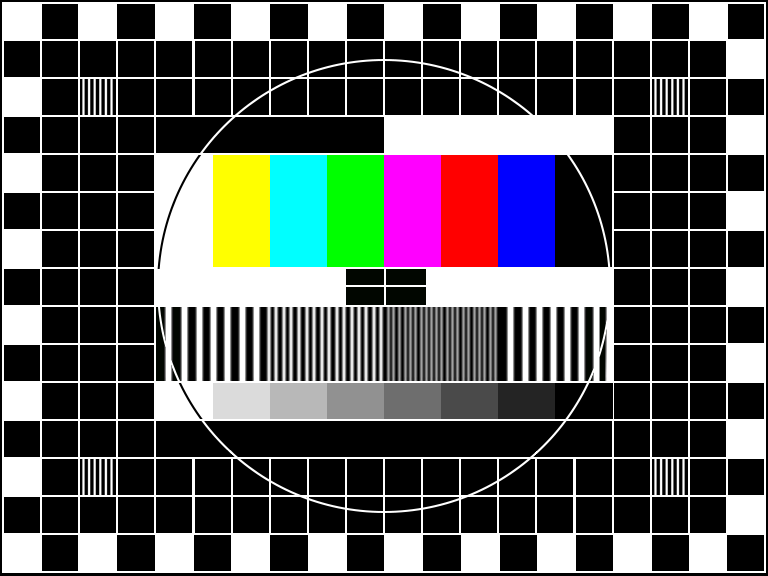
Recreation of the heavily modified Grundig VG 1001 variant used in Bulgaria.

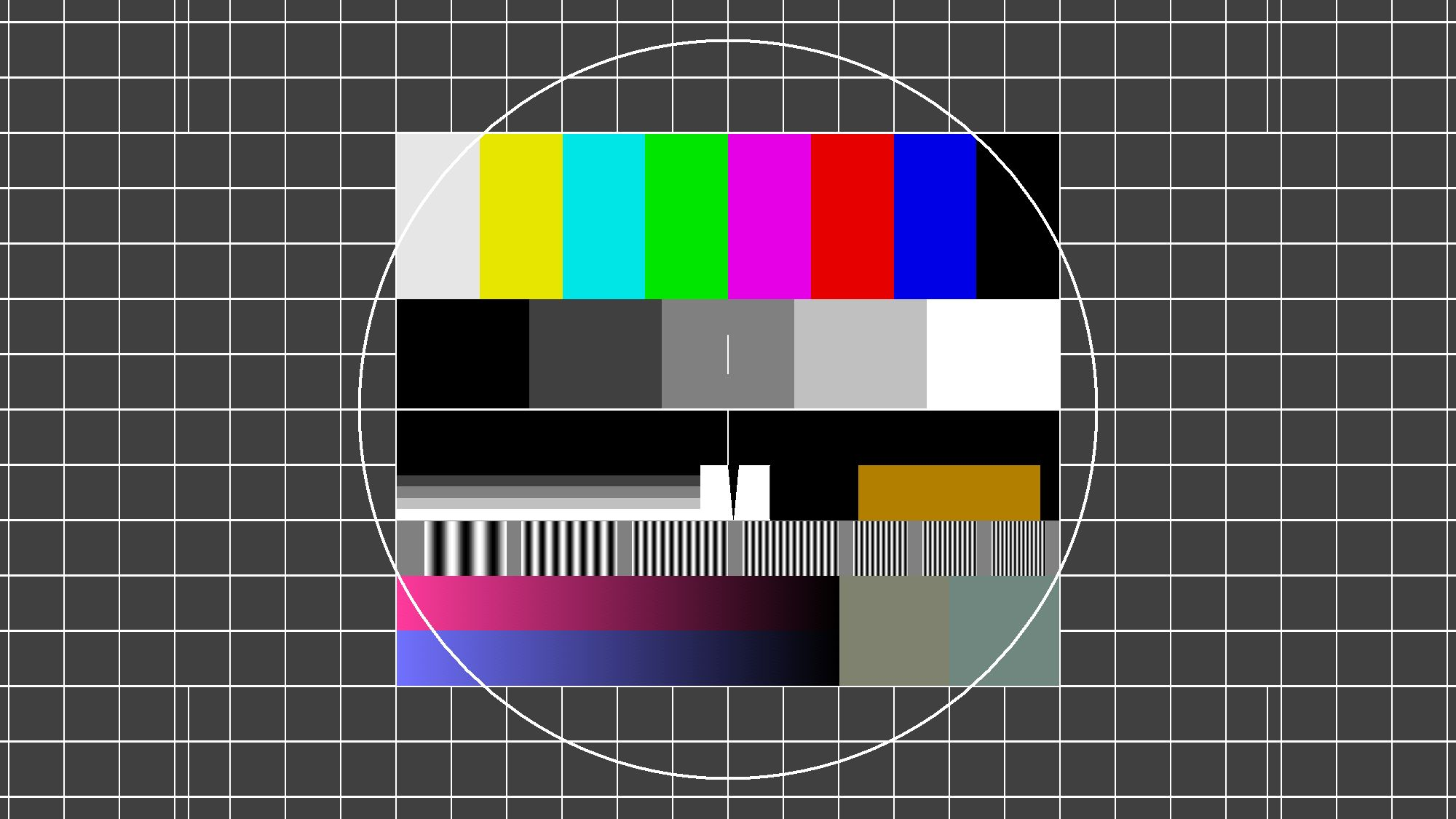
Recreation of the 16:9 / PALplus variation of the FuBK test pattern, same as the one generated from a Grundig VG 1100.

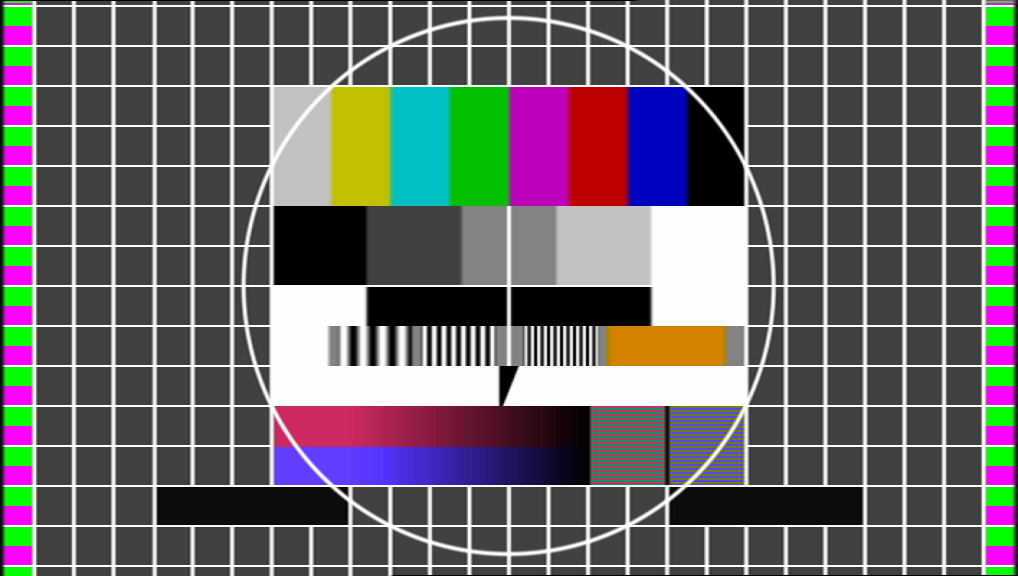
Widescreen FuBK pattern with anti-PAL and clock cut-outs. Generated by a DK-Technologies PT5300.

== Usage ==
This pattern was used by many broadcasters, including:

- ARD and ZDF (Germany, ARD also used the 16:9 variation)
- Norddeutscher Rundfunk (NDR Fernsehen; Northern German Broadcasting Hamburg)
- Westdeutscher Rundfunk (WDR Fernsehen; West German Broadcasting Cologne)
- Südwestrundfunk (SWR Fernsehen; southwest Germany)
- Deutsche Bundespost, Deutsche Telekom and T-Systems (Germany)
- Hessischer Rundfunk (hr-fernsehen, Germany)
- Kabel Deutschland and Premiere (Germany)
- Hrvatska radiotelevizija (Croatian Radiotelevision)
- Argentina Televisora Color, Telefe (Argentina)
- Rupavahini (Sri Lanka)
- RTL9 (Luxembourg)
- Rádio e Televisão de Portugal (RTP; Portuguese public broadcasting corporation)
- Islamic Republic of Iran Broadcasting (IRIB; used a variation of the pattern)
- RTL-TVI and VT4 (Belgium)
- Canal+ (Belgium; used a modification of the pattern with grid cross)
- NRK (Norwegian Broadcasting Corporation)
- YLE, Kolmoskanava, MTV3 and Nelonen (Finland)
- Yugoslav Radio Television (RTV Zagreb, Sarajevo)
- SRG SSR (SF, TSR, TSI); Teleclub (Switzerland)
- Doordarshan (Indian public television broadcaster; 4:3 version without circle)
- BTV6 and GTV9 in Australia
- Channel 5 and Channel 7 (Thailand)
- Magyar Televízió (Hungarian public television broadcaster; replaced Philips PM5544 from 2009)
- Alfa TV Budapest, TV2 Hungary
- NPO 1, NPO 2, NPO 3 (Netherlands)
- Nozema and Staatsbedrijf der Posterijen, Telegrafie en Telefonie (Netherlands)
- Televiziunea Română (Romanian public television broadcaster; with and without circle)
- Czechoslovak Television
- ERTT (Tunisia)
- M-Net and e.tv (South Africa)
- al-Jamahiriya TV (Libya; original and modified versions)
- Kanal 2 and TV 2 Zulu (Denmark)
- Channel One Russia (Grundig VG 1100 variant; used from June 1, 2011 until January 31, 2023)
- TVRI from 1974 until 31 December 1984, TPI from 1991 until early-2000 (Indonesia)
- Televerket Kabel-TV (Sweden)
- Sky One (United Kingdom)
- Warszawska Telewizja Kablowa „Porion” (Poland)

=== Usage Gallery ===
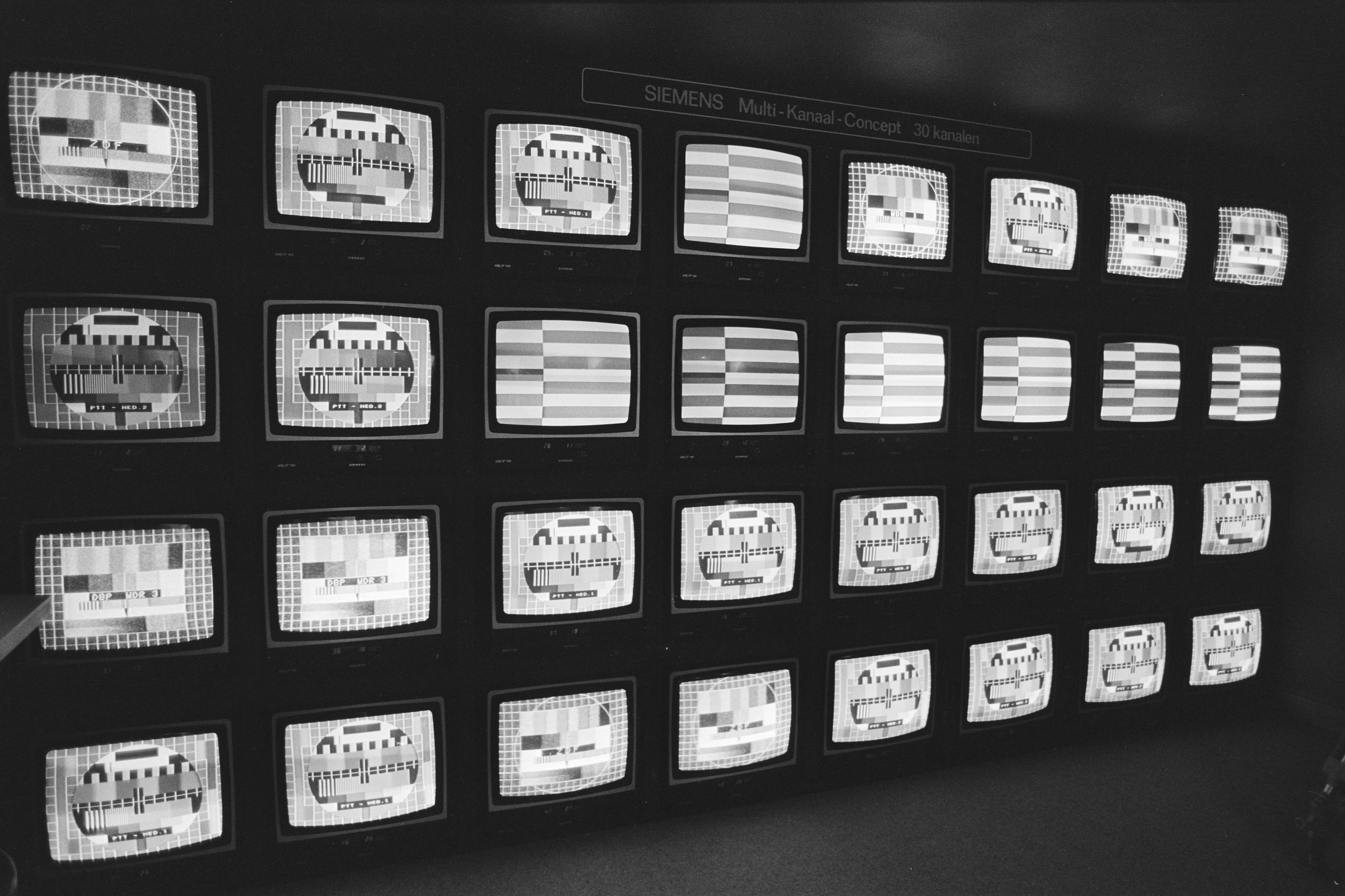
Telefunken FuBK and Philips PM5544 test cards in a Dutch cable TV demonstration in March 1981.

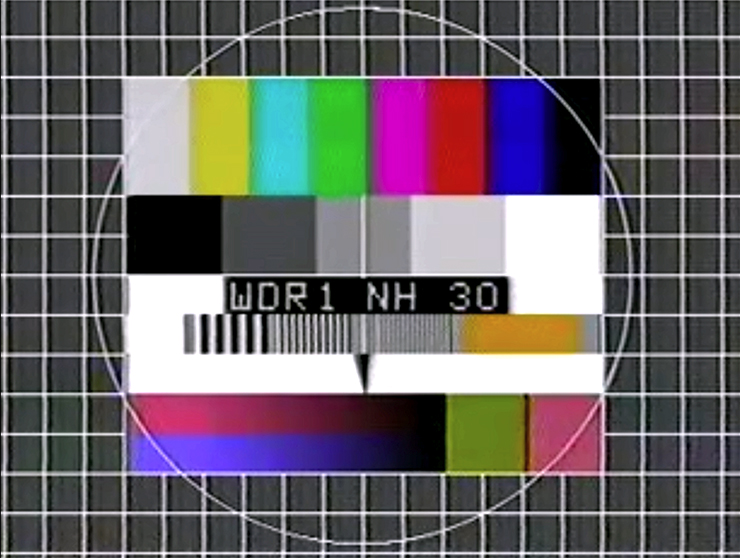
Off-air screen capture of ARD Das Erste test card broadcast by WDR from the Sender Nordhelle transmitter in the 1980s.

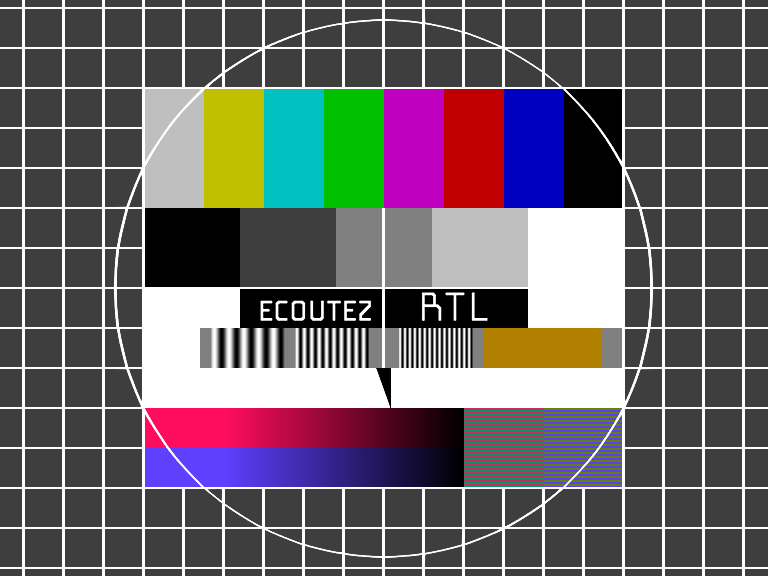
Recreation of the RTL9 testcard (1972–1991), based on a 1982 photo.

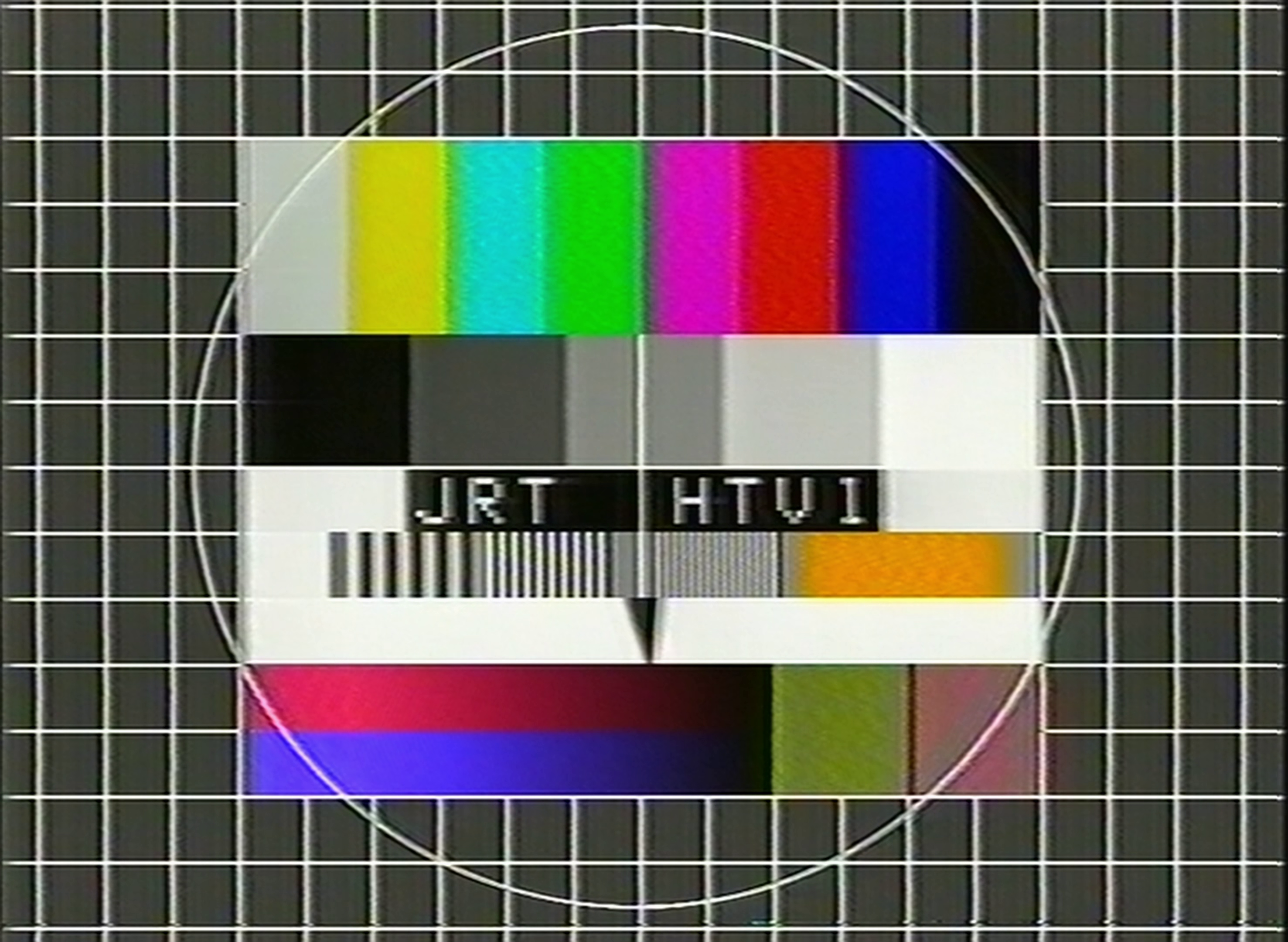
Over-the-air recording of the HTV1 test card, broadcast by the Croatian Radiotelevision around the 1990s.

== Cultural references ==
The Telefunken FuBK test card is featured in the 2016 Finnish indie video game My Summer Car, which the player's television sets in his house and in the in-game town's jail would show during the in-game overnight broadcast break. This was done to mimic the Finnish public broadcaster YLE's test card, which was used from the 1970s until the 2000s.

== See also ==
- Philips PM5544
- ETP-1
- Test card
