= Field strength =

Value of a vector-valued field

In physics, field strength refers to a value in a vector-valued field (e.g., in volts per meter, V/m, for an electric field E). For example, an electromagnetic field has both electric field strength and magnetic field strength.

Field strength is a common term referring to a vector quantity. However, the word 'strength' may lead to confusion as it might be referring only to the magnitude of that vector. For both gravitational field strength and for electric field strength, The Institute of Physics glossary states "this glossary avoids that term because it might be confused with the magnitude of the [gravitational or electric] field".

As an application, in radio frequency telecommunications, the signal strength excites a receiving antenna and thereby induces a voltage at a specific frequency and polarization in order to provide an input signal to a radio receiver. Field strength meters are used for such applications as cellular, broadcasting, wi-fi and a wide variety of other radio-related applications.

== See also ==
- Dipole field strength in free space
- Field strength tensor
- Signal strength in telecommunications
