= Signal strength in telecommunications =

In telecommunications, particularly in radio frequency engineering, signal strength is the transmitter power output as received by a reference antenna at a distance from the transmitting antenna. High-powered transmissions, such as those used in broadcasting, are measured in dB-millivolts per metre (dBmV/m). For very low-power systems, such as mobile phones, signal strength is usually expressed in dB-microvolts per metre (dBμV/m) or in decibels above a reference level of one milliwatt (dBm). In broadcasting terminology, 1 mV/m is 1000 μV/m or 60 dBμ (often written dBu).

== Examples ==
- 100 dBμ or 100 mV/m: blanketing interference may occur on some receivers
- 60 dBμ or 1.0 mV/m: frequently considered the edge of a radio station's protected area in North America
- 40 dBμ or 0.1 mV/m: the minimum strength at which a station can be received with acceptable quality on most receivers

== Relationship to average radiated power ==
The electric field strength at a specific point can be determined from the power delivered to the transmitting antenna, its geometry and radiation resistance. Consider the case of a center-fed half-wave dipole antenna in free space, where the total length L is equal to one half wavelength (λ/2). If constructed from thin conductors, the current distribution is essentially sinusoidal and the radiating electric field is given by

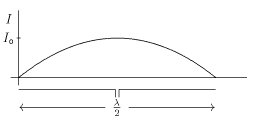
Current distribution on antenna of length $\scriptstyle{L}$ equal to one half wavelength ($\scriptstyle{\lambda /2}$).

$$E_\theta (r) =
{-jI_\circ\over 2\pi\varepsilon_0 c\, r}
{\cos\left(\scriptstyle{\pi\over 2}\cos\theta\right)\over\sin\theta}
e^{j\left(\omega t-kr\right)}$$

where $\scriptstyle{\theta}$ is the angle between the antenna axis and the vector to the observation point, $\scriptstyle{I_\circ}$ is the peak current at the feed-point, $\scriptstyle{\varepsilon_0 \, = \, 8.85\times 10^{-12} \, F/m }$ is the permittivity of free-space, $\scriptstyle{c \, = \, 3\times 10^8 \, m/s}$ is the speed of light in vacuum, and $\scriptstyle{r}$ is the distance to the antenna in meters. When the antenna is viewed broadside ($\scriptstyle{\theta \, = \, \pi/2}$) the electric field is maximum and given by

$$\vert E_{\pi/2}(r) \vert = { I_\circ \over 2\pi\varepsilon_0 c\, r }\, .$$

Solving this formula for the peak current yields

$$I_\circ = 2\pi\varepsilon_0 c \, r\vert E_{\pi/2}(r) \vert \, .$$

The average power to the antenna is

$${P_{avg} = {1 \over 2} R_a \, I_\circ^2 }$$

where $\scriptstyle{R_a = 73.13\,\Omega}$ is the center-fed half-wave antenna's radiation resistance. Substituting the formula for $\scriptstyle{I_\circ}$ into the one for $\scriptstyle{P_{avg}}$ and solving for the maximum electric field yields

$$\vert E_{\pi/2}(r)\vert \, = \, {1 \over \pi\varepsilon_0 c \, r}
\sqrt{{ P_{avg} \over 2R_a}} \, = \,
{9.91 \over r} \sqrt{ P_{avg} } \quad (L = \lambda /2) \, .$$

Therefore, if the average power to a half-wave dipole antenna is 1 mW, then the maximum electric field at 313 m (1027 ft) is 1 mV/m (60 dBμ).

For a short dipole ($\scriptstyle{L \ll \lambda /2}$) the current distribution is nearly triangular. In this case, the electric field and radiation resistance are

$$E_\theta (r) =
{-jI_\circ \sin (\theta) \over 4 \varepsilon_0 c\, r} \left ( {L \over \lambda} \right )
e^{j\left(\omega t-kr\right)} \, , \quad
R_a = 20\pi^2 \left ( {L \over \lambda} \right )^2 .$$

Using a procedure similar to that above, the maximum electric field for a center-fed short dipole is

$$\vert E_{\pi/2}(r)\vert \, = \, {1 \over \pi\varepsilon_0 c \, r}
\sqrt{{ P_{avg} \over 160}} \, = \,
{9.48 \over r} \sqrt{ P_{avg} } \quad (L \ll \lambda /2)\, .$$

== RF signals ==
Although there are cell phone base station tower networks across many nations globally, there are still many areas within those nations that do not have good reception. Some rural areas are unlikely to ever be covered effectively since the cost of erecting a cell tower is too high for only a few customers. Even in areas with high signal strength, basements and the interiors of large buildings often have poor reception.

Weak signal strength can also be caused by destructive interference of the signals from local towers in urban areas, or by the construction materials used in some buildings causing significant attenuation of signal strength. Large buildings such as warehouses, hospitals and factories often have no usable signal further than a few metres from the outside walls.

This is particularly true for the networks which operate at higher frequency since these are attenuated more by intervening obstacles, although they are able to use reflection and diffraction to circumvent obstacles.

=== Estimated received signal strength ===
The estimated received signal strength in an active RFID tag can be estimated as follows:

$$\mathrm{dBm_e} = -43.0 - 40.0\ \log_{10}\left( \frac{r}{R}\right)$$

In general, you can take the path loss exponent into account:

$$\mathrm{dBm_e} = -43.0 - 10.0 \ \gamma \ \log_{10}\left( \frac{r}{R}\right)$$

Parameter	Description
dBm_{e}	Estimated received power in active RFID tag
−43	Minimum received power
40	Average path loss per decade for mobile networks
r	Distance mobile device - cell tower
R	Mean radius of the cell tower
γ	Path loss exponent

The effective path loss depends on frequency, topography, and environmental conditions.

Actually, one could use any known signal power dBm_{0} at any distance r_{0} as a reference:

$$\mathrm{dBm_e} = \mathrm{dBm}_0 - 10.0 \ \gamma \ \log_{10}\left( \frac{r}{r_0} \right)$$

=== Number of decades ===
$\log_{10} ( R / r )$ would give an estimate of the number of decades, which coincides with an average path loss of 40 dB/decade.

=== Estimate the cell radius ===
When we measure cell distance r and received power dBm_{m} pairs, we can estimate the mean cell radius as follows:

$$R_e = \operatorname{avg}[ \ r \ 10 ^ { ( \mathrm{dBm_m} + 43.0 ) / 40.0 } \ ]$$

Specialized calculation models exist to plan the location of a new cell tower, taking into account local conditions and radio equipment parameters, as well as consideration that mobile radio signals have line-of-sight propagation, unless reflection occurs.

== See also ==
- Cellular network
- Mobile phone
- Cellular repeater
- Dropped call
- Dead zone (cell phone)
- Dipole field strength in free space
- Field strength meter
- Received signal strength indicator
- S meter
- Signal
- Mobile phone signal
- Mobile coverage
