= Offset =

Offset or Off-Set may refer to:

== Arts, entertainment, and media ==
- "Off-Set", a song by T.I. and Young Thug from the Furious 7: Original Motion Picture Soundtrack
- Offset (EP), a 2018 EP by singer Kim Chung-ha
- Offset (film), a 2006 film featuring Răzvan Vasilescu and Alexandra Maria Lara
- Offset Software, a video game development company
  - Project Offset, working title of a first-person shooter video game by Offset Software

== People ==
- Offset (rapper), a rapper and member of the American hip-hop trio Migos

== Science and engineering ==
- Offset (botany), a separable part of a plant that can develop into a new, independent plant
- Offset (computer science), the distance to (displacement of) an element within a data object
- Offset (gears), the perpendicular distance between the axes of hypoid or offset-facing gears
- Offset (geometry), see parallel curve
- Offset (geophysics), the distance between a source and receiver of seismic or other geophysical readings
- DC bias or DC offset, the mean amplitude of a waveform (originally, a direct-current ("DC") waveform)
- Displacement (vector) or "offset", the position of a point or a particle in reference to an origin or to a previous position
- Frequency offset, the difference between a source and a reference frequency
- Offset dish antenna, a type of satellite dish
- Phase offset, see phase (waves)

== Other uses ==
- Offset (law), a reduction in the amount to be paid by a losing party on the basis of debt owed by the prevailing party
- Carbon offset, a financial instrument meant to aid efforts to reduce greenhouse gas emissions
- Offset agreement, a trade practice in the aerospace and defense industry
- Offset loan (finance), a type of flexible lending arrangement
- Offset printing, a printing technique where an inked image is transferred from plate to printing surface via a rubber blanket
- UTC offset, time difference at a certain place from Coordinated Universal Time

== See also ==
- Onset (disambiguation)
