= Onanon =

- Industry: Hardware connectors
- Headquarters: Milpitas, California
- Products: Electronic components
- Website: www.onanon.com

Onanon is a design, engineering and manufacturing company specializing in the automating panel array manufacturing process, which can produce multiple units in a single session. The company utilizes engineered plastics for manufacturing, using high-speed machinery and automation to produce connectors in large batches. The process removes the need for human handling, thus reducing the probability of error. Onanon utilizes printed circuit boards as a base to add other components. Headquartered in Milpitas, California, Onanon is the first company to introduce a PC board as a connector pin substrate, a technique which is considered standard today but was seen as revolutionary at the time.

== History ==
Onanon was founded in 1979 as a design, prototype and manufacturing firm specializing in value add connectors and cable assemblies with integrated electronics. The company branched into custom connector design, which has become its chief manufacturing method. Onanon uses multiple head automation in its manufacturing process, which increases the number of units that can be produced. The company has a proprietary “breadboard” panel array manufacturing method that allows engineers to build functionality directly into the connector, which saves costs for the buyer and adds functionality to the connector.

== Products ==
Onanon makes several products in the medical and industrial sectors. Because of the highly customizable nature of the company’s products, the company sells based on type or industry use. Onanon plans to build future products with an open architecture, allowing others to borrow from their design ideas.

=== Circuit Boards ===
Onanon manufactures advanced PC circuitry using a mostly automated batch method, in order to produce industrial computer boards for the industrial and healthcare sectors. With RoHS (restriction on hazardous substances), demand for solderless boards has surged.

=== Custom Connectors ===
Engineered plastic connectors made to any size or shape. Connectors can take passive or active electrical components, and pin count can vary as needed. Onanon also produces female clips and connectors.

=== Medical Connectors ===
Highly sensitive connectors that are designed to process inputs from the source. This allows OEMs to embed value-added microscale systems with intelligent designs. Onanon also makes embedded electronic connectors, which can boost signal strength or act as a shield to reduce EMI. Onanon also has rapid wire-termination technology, which reduces the need for solder that can potentially damage a PCB.

=== Medical Cables ===
Onanon medical cable assemblies are used in medical device applications. The company's manufacturing facility includes automated wire termination, molding, SMT component placement, and connector pin assembly. The company supplies cable assemblies to original equipment manufacturers (OEMs).

=== Sensors ===
Onanon connectors could be used as high-level, low impedance amplifiers in devices that send analog signals back and forth. Using the breadboard manufacturing technique, engineers can place operational amplifiers directly onto the connectors, which has the added benefit of reducing the need for wiring as well.
