= Onset =

Onset may refer to:

== Music ==
- Onset (audio), the beginning of a musical note or sound
- Interonset interval, a term in music

== Phonetics and phonology ==
- Syllable onset, a term in phonetics and phonology

== Other uses ==
- Onset, Massachusetts, village in the United States
  - Onset Island (Massachusetts), a small island located at the western end of the Cape Cod Canal
- The Onset, Liverpool indie rock group formed by Mike Badger of the La's
  - The Onset (album), a 2005 album by the band
- USS Onset (SP-1224), a United States Navy patrol boat in commission from 1917 to 1918
- "Onset", a 2019 song by Haiku Hands

== See also ==
- Offset (disambiguation)
