= Split sound system =

System of combining visual and aural signals in TV transmitters

Split sound is an old system in analog television transmitters. It has long been superseded, but transmitters working on this principle are still in use. In this system there are two almost independent transmitters, one for sound (aural) and one for picture (visual). The system requires more energy input relative to broadcast energy than the alternative system known as intercarrier system.

== Main stages of a transmitter ==
All superheterodyne transmitters have the following stages:

- Oscillators
- Input stages :Buffer amplifiers, correction circuits etc.
- IF modulator and IF amplifiers
- Frequency mixer
- RF power amplifiers
- Antenna system

== Split sound TV transmitter ==
In split sound TV broadcasting, two of each of the above stages (except the antenna system) are required, one for sound and one for video. At the output of the RF amplifiers both signals are combined by a high-power diplexer; the combined signal is transmitted.

== Split sound vs intercarrier system ==
- In split sound system a high power diplexer is used at the output of the RF amplifiers. Such diplexers are expensive and bulky. In intercarrier system where the combining is achieved at a low level stage no diplexer is used.
- Whereas in intercarrier system RF amplifiers are common for both the visual and aural signals, in split sound system visual and aural transmitters have separate RF amplifiers (tetrodes or klystrons). Thus, all else being equal, the power consumption of the split sound system is more than that of the intercarrier system.
- In intercarrier system the two IF signals may interfere with each other to produce interference products out of the operating channel. In order to protect the neighbouring channels a notch filter is used. In split sound no interference products appear at the output, so no filter is needed.
