= Output power of an analog TV transmitter =

Electrical power applied to the antenna system in a transmitter station

The output power of a TV transmitter is the electric power applied to antenna system. There are two definitions: nominal (or peak) and thermal. Analogue television systems put about 70% to 90% of the transmitters power into the sync pulses. The remainder of the transmitter's power goes into transmitting the video's higher frequencies and the FM audio carrier. Digital television modulation systems are about 30% more efficient than analogue modulation systems overall.

== Analogue vs digital ==
Analogue

- The large amount of energy that Sync Pulses use is largely independent of the measurement system and efficiency of the analogue TV transmitter (as most analogue transmitters have on average 75% efficiency).
- The transmission of FM audio (including Stereo subcarriers) is only overall the 3rd largest consumer of TV transmitter power.
- Power consumption (most to least) : Sync Pulses, High Frequency Video, FM Audio, Vestigial AM

Digital

- DVB like transmission systems, with their groups of mathematically related carriers are not quite as energy efficient as 8VSB systems
- 8VSB transmission systems only provide a limited "Forced DC" signal (that consumes about 7% of the transmitters energy) that under multipath conditions can be lost causing a signal lock loss event

== Power defined in terms of voltage ==
The average power for a sinusoidal drive is

$$P = \frac{1}{T}\int_0^T i(t) \cdot e (t) dt\,\!.$$

For a system where the voltage and the current are in phase, the output power can be given as

$$P = \frac{1}{T \cdot R}\int_0^T e(t)^2 dt\,\!.$$

In this equation $R$ is the resistance and $e (t)$ is the output voltage

== Nominal power of a TV transmitter ==
Nominal power of a TV transmitter is given as the power during the sync interval. (For the sake of simplicity aural power is omitted) Since, the voltage during the sync interval is a fixed value,

$$P_n = \frac{E_p^2}{2\cdot R}\,\!$$

$$P_n = \frac{E^2}{R}\,\!$$

where $E$ is the rms value of the output voltage.

To measure the nominal output power, measuring devices with time constants much greater than the line time are used. So the measuring equipment's measure only the highest level (sync pulse) of a line waveform which is 100%.

This power level is the commercial power of the transmitter.

== Thermal power ==
In analogue TV broadcasting, the video signal modulates a carrier by a kind of amplitude modulation (VSB modulation or C3F). The modulation polarity is negative. That means that the higher the level of the video signal the lower the power of the RF signal.

The lowest possible modulating signal during the synchrone interval yields 100% of the carrier. (The nominal power of the transmitter.) The blanking level (300 mV) yields 73% (in an ideally linear transmitter). Usually the figure 75% is found to be acceptable. The highest modulating signal at white (1000 mV) yields only 10% of the carrier. (so called residual carrier). Sometimes 12.5% is used as the residual carrier so the output power applied to the antenna system is considerably lower than the nominal power.

The thermal power which can be measured by a microwave power meter depends on the program content as well as the residual carrier and sync depths.

== Ratio of thermal power to nominal power ==
Since the program content is variable, the thermal power varies during the transmission. However, for testing purposes a standard line waveform can be applied to the transmitter.

Usually line waveforms corresponding to 350 mV or 300 mV black image (and without field sync) are applied to the input of the transmitter.

For System B, the duration of the black level 300 mV (together with the front and back porches), is 59.3 μs and it corresponds to 73% of maximum voltage level. The duration of the sync pulse is 4.7 μs. The total duration of the line is 64 μs.

$$P_t = \frac{E^2}{64\cdot R}\cdot (4.7\cdot ( 100\%)^2 + 59.3\cdot ( 73\%)^2) \approx 57\% \cdot \frac{ E^2 }{R}\,\!$$

So the maximum thermal power applied to the antenna system is 57% of the nominal power, even in the black scene. In normal program content this ratio may be around 25% or less.
