= White clipper =

A white clipper (or white limiter) is a circuit in professional video products that limits the maximum amplitude of the luminance part of the analogue video signal to 1 volt. It is essential for both analogue recording and transmission of video material.

== Video signal ==
The standard video signal (or more precisely composite video signal) is a signal with a maximum level of 1 volt into 75 Ω. In this signal 0.3 volt corresponds to black and 1 volt corresponds to white. The 0.0 volt to 0.3 volt range is reserved for the sync pulses. Video circuits are designed around these limits. These limits apply to recording on analogue video tape and analogue transmission as well as in analogue to digital video converters.

For transmission, the baseband signal modulates the amplitude of the carrier. The modulation index is negative, so higher video level yields lower carrier (RF) level and vice versa. 1 volt (white) video yields only 10% of the full carrier level. The audio signal is frequency-modulated. In a later stage the audio signal is superimposed on the video signal.

If, for any reason, the video signal increases beyond 1 volt, the portion of video in excess of 1 volt begins to interfere with the audio signal. The repetition rate of a line is about 15 kHz (15625 Hz in system B and 15750 Hz in system M). The repetition rate of a field is 50 or 60 Hz (50 Hz in system B and 60 Hz in system M). So the interference has two components: a very high-pitched sound of 15 kHz and a low-pitched sound of 50 Hz (or 60 Hz). On the other hand, video input in excess of 1.1 volt results in the loss of the carrier level and this tends to shut down the transmitter.

For this reason a white clipper circuit is used to strictly limit the maximum amplitude of the video waveform at the transmitter. For recording and general use the white clipper is used to limit the maximum excursion of the signal. For recording this prevents overmodulation on analogue systems which tends to corrupt adjacent tracks in helical scanning; while on digital systems the peak signal amplitude is an absolute numerical value and cannot be exceeded.

== Chrominance ==
A color TV signal is almost the same as a monochrome signal, except that the chrominance signal (a subcarrier modulated by the color information) is superimposed on the monochrome signal (luminance). In a studio environment the total video level while showing a color at maximum saturation (such as yellow) may exceed 1 V. But for transmission, maximum amplitude is limited by the use of the various matrix values in the PAL or NTSC encoder.

== The circuit ==
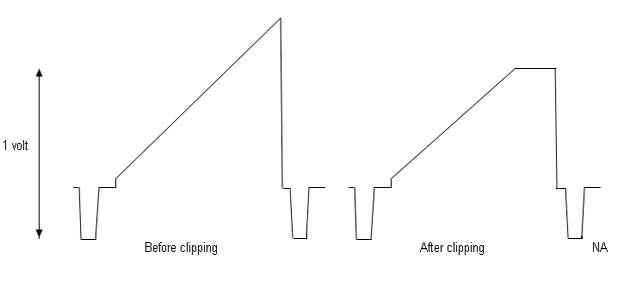
The line waveform with excessive white level at the input and at the output of the clipper. In this example, a standard sawtooth wave is used. Note that the signal is clipped but not attenuated.

The white clipper is a circuit that clips out the excess level of video signal. It is especially important for those transmitters that receive signals from other transmitters through professional receivers. The circuit has two parallel arms. In the first arm a Zener diode clips out the signal in excess of 1 volt. In the second arm, the chrominance signal bypasses the Zener diode through a band-pass filter. Sometimes it is necessary or desirable to create a soft clipping action where some highlight detail can be preserved in high contrast scenes. This is known as a "knee" circuit after the shape of the transfer characteristic graph.

== Burn-out ==
Video cameras can easily produce over 1 volt in high contrast scenes. However, because the analogue video chain is designed to work within the limits laid out above, the use of the white clipper may result in loss of highlight detail or "burn-out", while a limited contrast ratio is achieved.

== See also ==
- TV transmitter
- Residual carrier
