= Hanover bars =

Undesirable visual artifact in television

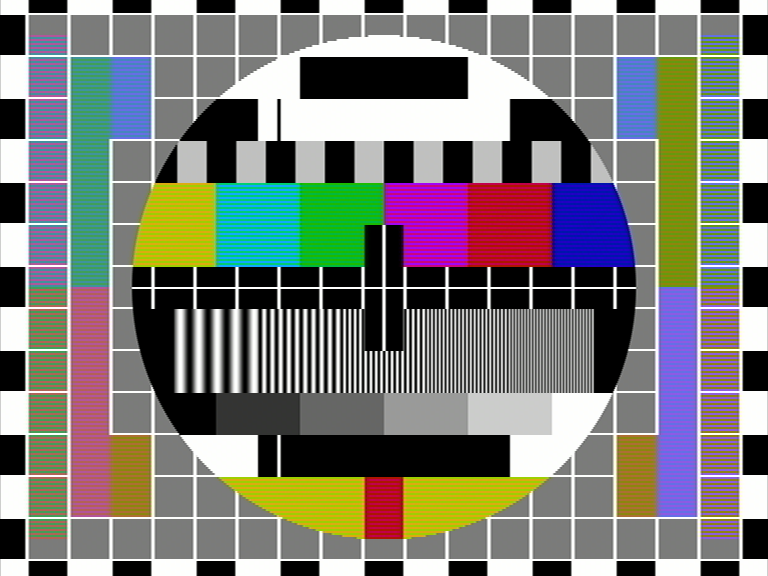
Simulated strong Hanover bars shown on a Philips PM5544 test pattern. Note: Hanover bars can only be seen by viewing the full-size image

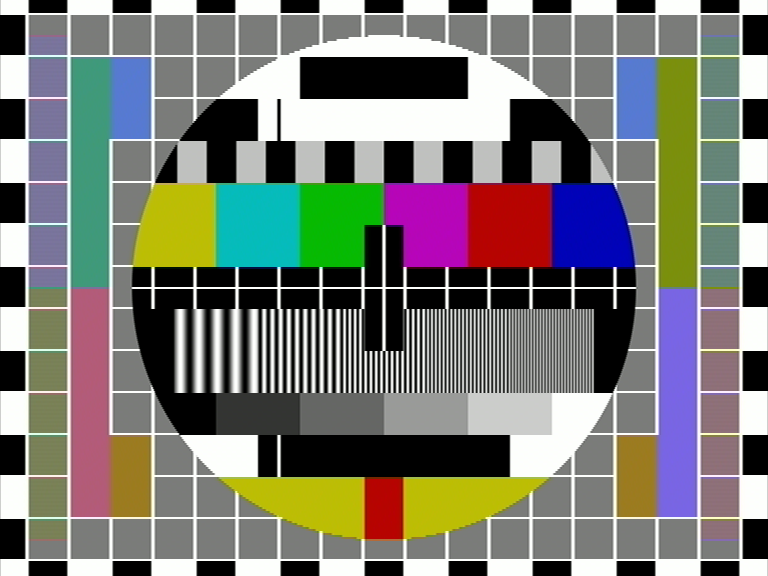
Simulated cancellation of Hanover bars through a chroma delay line

Hanover bars, in one of the PAL television video formats, are an undesirable visual artifact in the reception of a television image. The name refers to the city of Hanover, in which the PAL system developer Telefunken Fernseh und Rundfunk GmbH was located.

The PAL system encodes color as YUV. The U (corresponding to B-Y) and V (corresponding to R-Y) signals carry the color information for a picture, with the phase of the V signal reversed (i.e. shifted through 180 degrees) on alternate lines (hence the name PAL, or phase alternate line). This is done to cancel minor phase errors in the reception process. However, if gross errors occur, complementary errors from the V signal carry into the U signal, and thus visible stripes occur.

Later PAL systems introduced alterations to ensure that Hanover bars do not occur, introducing a swinging burst to the color synchronization. Other PAL systems may handle this problem differently.

== Suppression of Hanover bars ==
To suppress Hanover bars, PAL color decoders use a delay line that repeats the chroma information from each previous line and blends it with the current line. This causes phase errors to cancel out, at the cost of vertical color resolution, and in early designs, also a loss of color saturation proportional to the phase error.

== See also ==
- Dot crawl
- PAL
- PAL-S
