= Superheterodyne transmitter =

Transmitters using intermediate frequency

Superheterodyne transmitter is a radio or TV transmitter which uses an intermediate frequency signal in addition to radio frequency signal.

== Types of transmitters ==
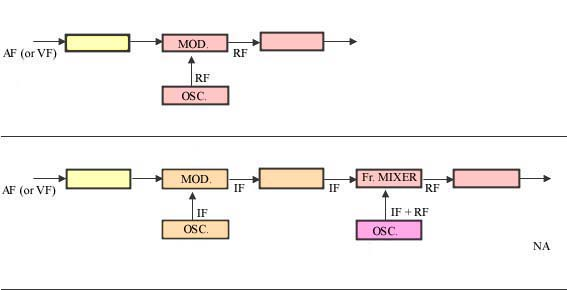
Above: Direct modulation, below superheterodyne transmitter

There are two types of transmitters. In some transmitters, the baseband information signal (audio (AF), video (VF) etc.) modulates the radio frequency (RF) signal. These direct modulation transmitters are relatively simple.

In the more complicated superheterodyne transmitter, the baseband signal modulates an intermediate frequency (IF) signal. After stages for correction, equalization and sometimes amplification, the IF signal is converted to an RF signal by a stage named frequency mixer or frequency converter. Superheterodyne transmitters are more complex than direct modulation transmitters.

== Mathematical approach ==
Let

$f (t)$ be the information signal
$\omega_{R}$ be the angular RF,
$\omega_{I}$ be the angular IF and
$\omega_{s}$ be the angular subcarrier frequency.

In direct modulation transmitter the information signal modulates the RF carrier. If the type of modulation is conventional amplitude modulation the RF output is,

$$\mbox{RF}=(1+f(t))\cdot \sin(\omega_{R} t)$$

Likewise in superheterodyne transmitter the modulated IF is;

$$\mbox{IF}=(1+f(t))\cdot \sin(\omega_{I} t)$$

This signal is applied to a frequency mixer. The other input to the mixer is a high frequency subcarrier signal.

$\mbox{SC}= \sin( \omega_{s} t)$

The two signals are multiplied to give;

$$\mbox{IF}\cdot \mbox{SC}=(1+f(t))\cdot \sin(\omega_{I} t)\cdot \sin(\omega_{s} t)$$

Applying well known rules of trigonometry;

$$\mbox{IF}\cdot \mbox{SC}=  \frac{1}{2}(1+f(t))\cdot (\cos(\omega_{s} t-\omega_{I} t)-\cos(\omega_{s}t +\omega_{I} t))$$

A filter at the output of the mixer filters out one of the terms at the right (usually the summation) leaving RF

$$\mbox{RF}= \frac{1}{2}(1+f(t)) \cdot \cos(\omega_{s} t-\omega_{I} t)$$

Here $\omega_{s}-\omega_{I}$ is the required angular RF; i.e., $\omega_R= \omega_{s}-\omega_{I}$

After phase and amplitude equalization,

$$\mbox{RF}=(1+f(t))\cdot \sin(\omega_{R} t)$$

== Advantages of superheterodyne ==
- In transmitters several correction and equalization stages are used after modulation. For direct modulation these stages must be developed separately for each output RF (so called channel). On the other hand, in superheterodyne transmitters, only a single intermediate frequency signal is used, so only one type of stage for IF is developed. Thus, each stage is more reliable in superheterodyne. Also R&D is much easier for the designer.
- Operators may change the RF output of the transmitter. Changing the output RF for direct modulation is very difficult because practically all stages need to be retuned for the new RF. On the other hand, with superheterodyne only the output stages need to be retuned.
- With a fast enough DAC, the modulated IF signal can be generated directly, digitally from a microprocessor or a digital signal processor. This will permit usage of more advanced methods of modulation without the use of complicated modulator hardware, and make software-defined radio possible.

== See also ==
- Superheterodyne receiver
- TV transmitter topics
- TV transmitters
