= VIT signals =

Series of test signals in TV transmission

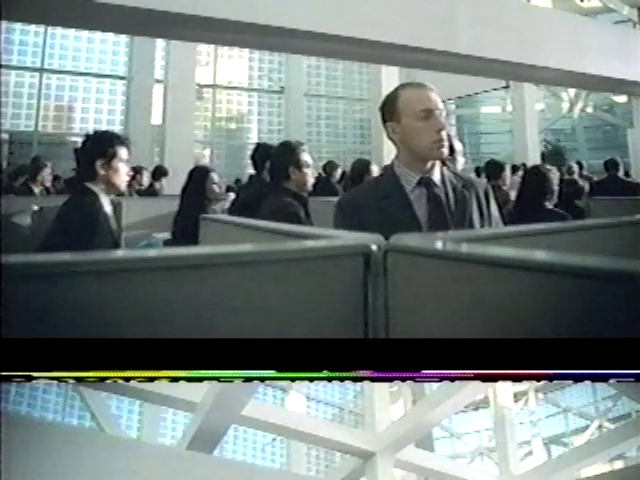
Various VIT signals are embedded in the vertical blanking interval, as seen in this VHS recording.

In television broadcasting, VIT signals (vertical interval test signals) are a group of test signals inserted in the composite video signal. These signals are used to weight the transmission characteristics of the system between the test generator and the output of the demodulator, where the system includes the microwave links, or TVROs as well as the TV transmitters and the transposers. There are both ATSC and EBU standards for VIT. (Because analogue television is being phased out globally, VIT standards are considered superseded.)

== Blanking in CVS ==
In a composite video signal (CVS) there are two types of blanking: horizontal and vertical. Horizontal blanking is between lines and vertical blanking is between fields (half frames). In a poorly tuned TV receiver the horizontal blanking can be seen at the right or left of the image and the vertical blanking can be seen at the top or bottom of the image. VIT signals are inserted in the vertical blanking.

=== Vertical blanking ===
In each field vertical blanking is about 1612 μs in System B (also G and H; analogue system in most of Europe) and 1333 μs in System M (analogue TV system in USA). This duration is equal to 25 lines in system B and 21 lines in system M. Although 7.5 lines are used for synchronization of the image, the remaining lines can be used for other purposes. Two of these lines in each field are reserved for test signals. Since there are two fields in each frame (image), the number of lines reserved for test signals is four per frame.

== Test signals ==
In both systems, line numbers 17 and 18 are assigned for VIT signals in each field. (These line numbers are used just for the first field. For second field, they correspond to line 280 and 281 in system M, and line 330 and 331 in system B.)

Usually the following test signals are used:

- Luminance bar (low frequency tilt)
- 2T signal (Overshoot)
- 20T signal (differential gain and phase)
- Staircase (luminance linearity)
- Group of sine waves with different frequencies (video characteristics)
- Color carrier superimposed on staircase (differential gain and phase)
- Group of color carriers with different amplitudes (intermodulation of luminance and color)

== See also ==
- Signal generator
- TV transmitter
