= Television in Mozambique =

Television was introduced to Mozambique in 1981. For more than a decade, Televisão de Moçambique was the country's only television channel. Its monopoly was broken by the now-defunct RTK in 1993 and was followed by several other television stations. Maputo houses the facilities of practically all television channels in Mozambique. Foreign channels RTP África and Televisão Miramar have high viewership rates.

== History ==
When Mozambique was under Portuguese control, Rádio Clube de Moçambique (the current Rádio Moçambique) had plans to start a television service. These were likely halted as an effect of the country's independence in 1975.

In August 1979, an Italian company set up a small improvised studio at the Maputo Internacional Fair (FACIM).

Experimental Television of Mozambique (Televisão Experimental de Moçambique) started its broadcasts on 3 February 1981 on Sundays from 6:30pm to 10pm, on UHF channel 33 in Maputo. Gradually its broadcasting increased to the entire week (in 1986 it was broadcasting six hours a day and four days a week), achieving that goal in 1991. Color television was introduced in 1984.

TVM started broadcasting to Beira in April 1992 with funding from RTP, who provided technical support in the development of the network due to a protocol signed in September 1989., followed by Nampula in September 1994, as well as the ability of relaying RTP Internacional, whose terrestrial frequency was replaced by RTP África in 1998.

The television market started liberalizing in 1993, ending the precarious phase of production of advertising and programming, as well as the appearance of local production houses. The year was also marked by the first broadcast of RTK, the first private television channel, founded by Carlos Klimt. RTK was showing weaker finances by the end of the 90s, with the channel starting to give airtime to the Universal Church of the Kingdom of God, who, indirectly, in 1998, started Televisão Miramar. Miramar was a de facto affiliate of the Record network, receiving Brazilian programming on tape delay, in its early years, local programming was limited to news bulletins and UCKG programming. On 25 June 1999, TVM started satellite broadcasts.

In 2002, RTK shut down while STV started broadcasting, becoming the first and only TVAfrica affiliate (other than sports programming) in English, aiming to increase the amount of Portuguese-speaking programming at a later phase. STV quit TVAfrica before its shutdown as it went contrary to Daniel David's ambitions for obtaining a purely local profile.

A pirate television station appeared in 2005, reportedly airing pornographic content. After its closure, 9TV and TV Maná Moçambique (Jorge Tadeu's Maná Church) started broadcasting. 9TV was known for its initial phase where it was devoid of news, and aimed at a younger audience, a profile that continued for a short period after the rename to TIM. In February 2008, Pais do Amaral, a Portuguese businessman and former owner of TVI, decided to buy 60% of the shares, going against Mozambican regulations for foreign ownership, who set the limit at 20%. RTK resumed broadcasting in 2006 as KTV, with a similar profile, pioneering the usage of TV chats used mainly to fill overnight programming. Around 2010, the channel was under the control of the World Church of God's Power, changing its programming and editorial lines.

New channels emerged in the early 2010s.EcoTV in 2011 with coverage limited to Maputo and Gungu TV owned by the Gungu theatre group, led by actor Gilberto Mendes, in 2012. Televisão de Moçambique launched its second channel on 8 March 2012, but closed on 7 April 2017, being replaced by TVM Internacional.

Digital terrestrial platform Transporte, Multiplexação e Transmissão was created in 2017 with support from Chinese company StarTimes, receiving a US$156 million investment. On 20 September 2021, Mozambique began shutting down analog television signals in Maputo, Nampula and Tete, finishing the process on 10 December.

== Subscription television ==
MultiChoice entered the Mozambican market in 1995. It offers both terrestrial (GOtv, since 2015) and satellite (DStv) services. Since 2022, there has been a dedicated local channel, Maningue Magic, created in 2022; having produced titles in its first year such as Maida, The Influencer, Infiltrada and Date My Family which were later seen on other channels of the Africa Magic network.

TVCabo (owned by Visabeira) was registered as a company on 10 June 1996 and was the first double-play (TV and internet) provider in 2001.
