= PAL =

Color encoding system for analogue television

Analog television encoding systems by nation (at time of digital switchover, where applicable): NTSC SECAM PAL No info

PAL (an acronym for Phase Alternating Line) is a colour encoding system for analogue television. It was one of the three major analogue colour television standards, the others being NTSC and SECAM. In most countries it was broadcast at 625 lines, 50 fields (25 frames) per second, and associated with CCIR analogue broadcast television systems B, D, G, H, I and K. The articles on analogue broadcast television systems further describe frame rates, image resolution, and audio modulation.

PAL was developed by Walter Bruch at Telefunken in Hanover, West Germany, with important input from Gerhard Mahler. The format was patented by Telefunken in December 1962, citing Bruch as inventor, and unveiled to members of the European Broadcasting Union (EBU) on 3 January 1963. When asked why the system was named "PAL" and not "Bruch", the inventor answered that a "Bruch system" would probably not have sold very well ("Bruch" is the German word for "breakage").

== Geographic reach ==
PAL was adopted by most European countries, by some South American countries (Argentina, Brazil, Paraguay, Uruguay), by several African countries, including South Africa, and by most of Asia-Pacific (including the Middle East and South Asia). Countries in those regions that did not adopt PAL were France, Francophone Africa, several ex-Soviet states, Japan, South Korea, Liberia, Myanmar, the Philippines, and Taiwan.

With the introduction of home video releases and later digital sources (e.g., DVD-Video), the name "PAL" might be used to refer to digital formats, even though they use completely different colour encoding systems. For instance, 576i (576 interlaced lines) digital video with colour encoded as YCbCr, intended to be backward compatible and easily displayed on legacy PAL devices, is usually mentioned as "PAL" (e.g., "PAL DVD"). Likewise, video game consoles outputting a 50 Hz signal might be labeled as "PAL", as opposed to 60 Hz on NTSC machines. These designations should not be confused with the analogue colour system itself.

== History ==
In the 1950s, Western European countries began plans to introduce colour television and were faced with the fact that the NTSC standard demonstrated several weaknesses, including colour tone shifting under poor transmission conditions, which became a major issue considering Europe's geographical and weather-related particularities. To overcome NTSC's shortcomings, alternative standards were devised, resulting in the development of the PAL and SECAM standards. The goal was to provide a colour TV standard for the European picture frequency of 50 fields per second (50 hertz), and finding a way to eliminate the problems with NTSC.

PAL was developed by Walter Bruch at Telefunken in Hanover, West Germany, with important input from Gerhard Mahler. The format was patented by Telefunken in December 1962, citing Bruch as inventor, and unveiled to members of the European Broadcasting Union (EBU) on 3 January 1963. When asked why the system was named "PAL" and not "Bruch", the inventor answered that a "Bruch system" would probably not have sold very well ("Bruch" is the German word for "breakage").

The first broadcasts began in the United Kingdom in July 1967, followed by West Germany at the Berlin IFA on August 25. The BBC channel initially using the broadcast standard was BBC2, which had been the first UK TV service to introduce "625-lines" during 1964. The Netherlands and Switzerland started PAL broadcasts by 1968, with Austria following the next year.

Telefunken PALcolour 708T was the first PAL commercial TV set. It was followed by Loewe-Farbfernseher S 920 and F 900.

Telefunken was later bought by the French electronics manufacturer Thomson. Thomson also bought the Compagnie Générale de Télévision where Henri de France developed SECAM, the first European Standard for colour television. Thomson, now called Technicolour SA, also owns the RCA brand and licences it to other companies; Radio Corporation of America, the originator of that brand, created the NTSC colour TV standard before Thomson became involved.

In Italy, at first Indesit in co-operation with SEIMART tried to develop its own standard, ISA (Identificazione a Soppressione Alternata). However, while it presented very interesting technical and qualitative characteristics, it arrived too late and its eventual adoption would have resulted in heavy political and economic consequences, therefore the system was abandoned in favor of PAL in 1975.

The Soviet Union developed two further systems, mixing concepts from PAL and SECAM, known as TRIPAL and NIIR, that never went beyond tests.

In 1993, an evolution of PAL aimed to improve and enhance format by allowing 16:9 aspect ratio broadcasts, while remaining compatible with existing television receivers, was introduced. Named PALplus, it was defined by ITU recommendation BT.1197-1. It was developed at the University of Dortmund in Germany, in cooperation with German terrestrial broadcasters and European and Japanese manufacturers. Adoption was limited to European countries.

With the introduction of digital broadcasts and signal sources (such as DVDs, game consoles), the term PAL was used imprecisely to refer to the 625-line/50 Hz television system in general, to differentiate from the 525-line/60 Hz system generally used with NTSC. For example, DVDs were labelled as PAL or NTSC (referring to the line count and frame rate) even though technically the discs carry neither PAL nor NTSC encoded signal. These devices would still have analog outputs (such as composite video output), and would convert the digital signals (576i or 480i) to the analog standards to assure compatibility. CCIR 625/50 and EIA 525/60 are the proper names for these (line count and field rate) standards; PAL and NTSC on the other hand are methods of encoding colour information in the signal.

== Colour decoding methods ==
"PAL-D", "PAL-N", "PAL-H" and "PAL-K" designations on this section describe PAL decoding methods and are unrelated to broadcast systems with similar names.

The Telefunken licence covered any decoding method that relied on the alternating subcarrier phase to reduce phase errors, described as "PAL-D" for "delay", and "PAL-N" for "new" or "Chrominance Lock".

This excluded very basic PAL decoders that relied on the human eye to average out the odd/even line phase errors, and in the early 1970s some Japanese set manufacturers developed basic decoding systems to avoid paying royalties to Telefunken. These variations are known as "PAL-S" (for "simple" or "Volks-PAL"), operating without a delay line and suffering from the "Hanover bars" effect. An example of this solution is the Kuba Porta Color CK211P set. Another solution was to use a 1H analogue delay line to allow decoding of only the odd or even lines. For example, the chrominance on odd lines would be switched directly through to the decoder and also be stored in the delay line. Then, on even lines, the stored odd line would be decoded again. This method (known as 'gated NTSC') was adopted by Sony on their 1970s Trinitron sets (KV-1300UB to KV-1330UB), and came in two versions: "PAL-H" and "PAL-K" (averaging over multiple lines). It effectively treated PAL as NTSC, suffering from hue errors and other problems inherent in NTSC and required the addition of a manual hue control.

== Colour encoding ==
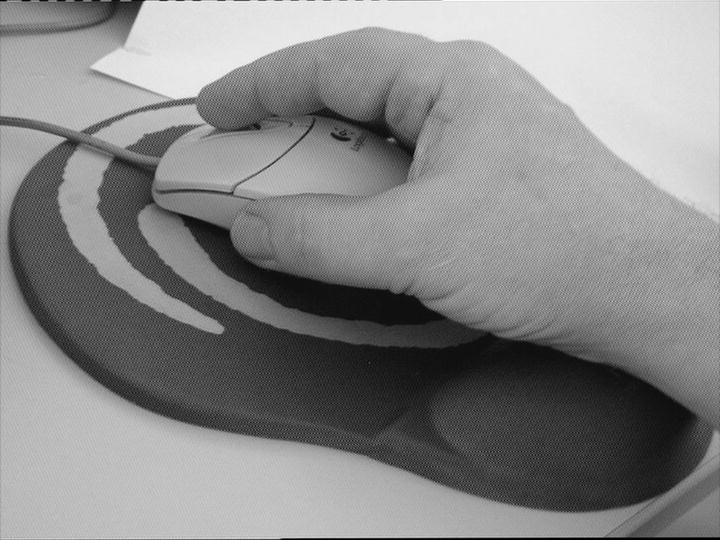
Un-decoded PAL image, showing chroma information as fine patterns chroma dots (click to zoom) overlapping the luma signal

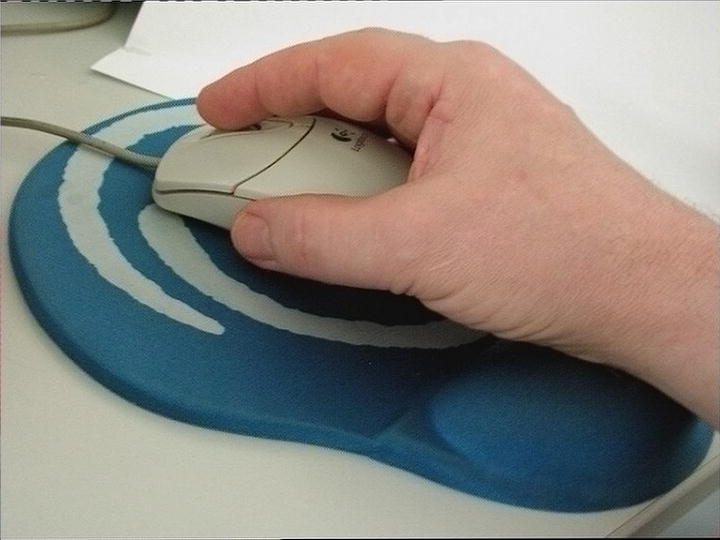
Decoded PAL image, with chroma fully recovered. Some minor artifacts (see dot crawl) are present across transition areas (click to zoom).

Most PAL systems encode the colour information using a variant of the Y′UV colour space. $Y'$comprises the monochrome luma signal, with the three RGB colour channels mixed down onto two, $U$ and $V$.

Like NTSC, PAL uses a quadrature amplitude modulated subcarrier carrying the chrominance information added to the luma video signal to form a composite video baseband signal. The frequency of this subcarrier is 4.43361875 MHz for PAL 4.43, compared to 3.579545 MHz for NTSC 3.58. The SECAM system, on the other hand, uses a frequency modulation scheme on its two line alternate colour subcarriers 4.25000 and 4.40625 MHz.

The name "Phase Alternating Line" describes the way that the phase of part of the colour information on the video signal is reversed with each line, which automatically corrects phase errors in the transmission of the signal by cancelling them out, at the expense of vertical frame colour resolution. Lines where the colour phase is reversed compared to NTSC are often called PAL or phase-alternation lines, which justifies one of the expansions of the acronym, while the other lines are called NTSC lines. Early PAL receivers relied on the human eye to do that cancelling; however, this resulted in a comb-like effect known as Hanover bars on larger phase errors. Thus, most receivers now use a chrominance analogue delay line, which stores the received colour information on each line of display; an average of the colour information from the previous line and the current line is then used to drive the picture tube. The effect is that phase errors result in saturation changes, which are less objectionable than the equivalent hue changes of NTSC. A minor drawback is that the vertical colour resolution is poorer than the NTSC system's, but since the human eye also has a colour resolution that is much lower than its brightness resolution, this effect is not visible. In any case, NTSC, PAL, and SECAM all have chrominance bandwidth (horizontal colour detail) reduced greatly compared to the luma signal.

Spectrum of a System I television channel with PAL

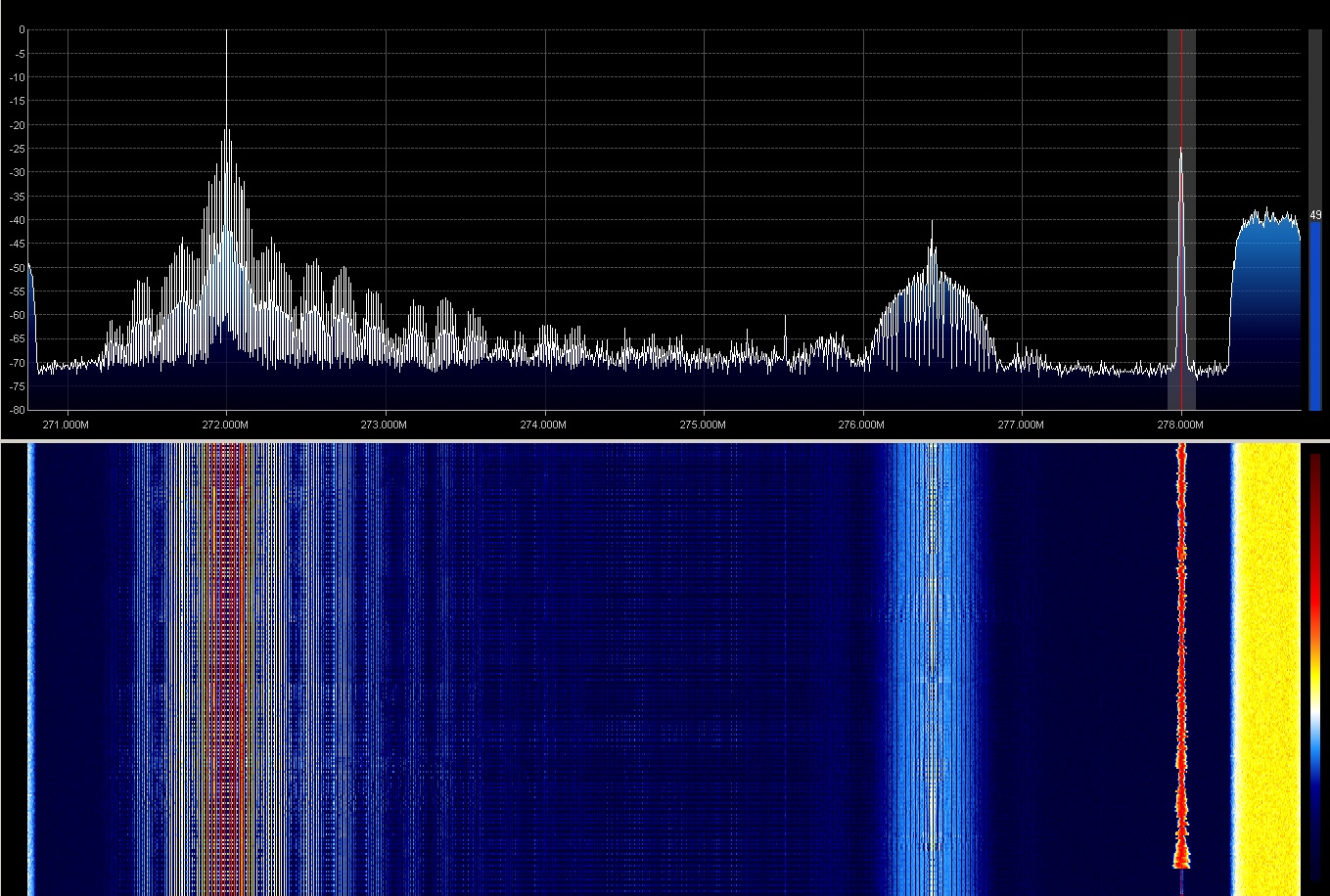
RF spectrogram and waterfall of an actual PAL-I transmission with NICAM

Oscillogram of composite PAL signal—one frame

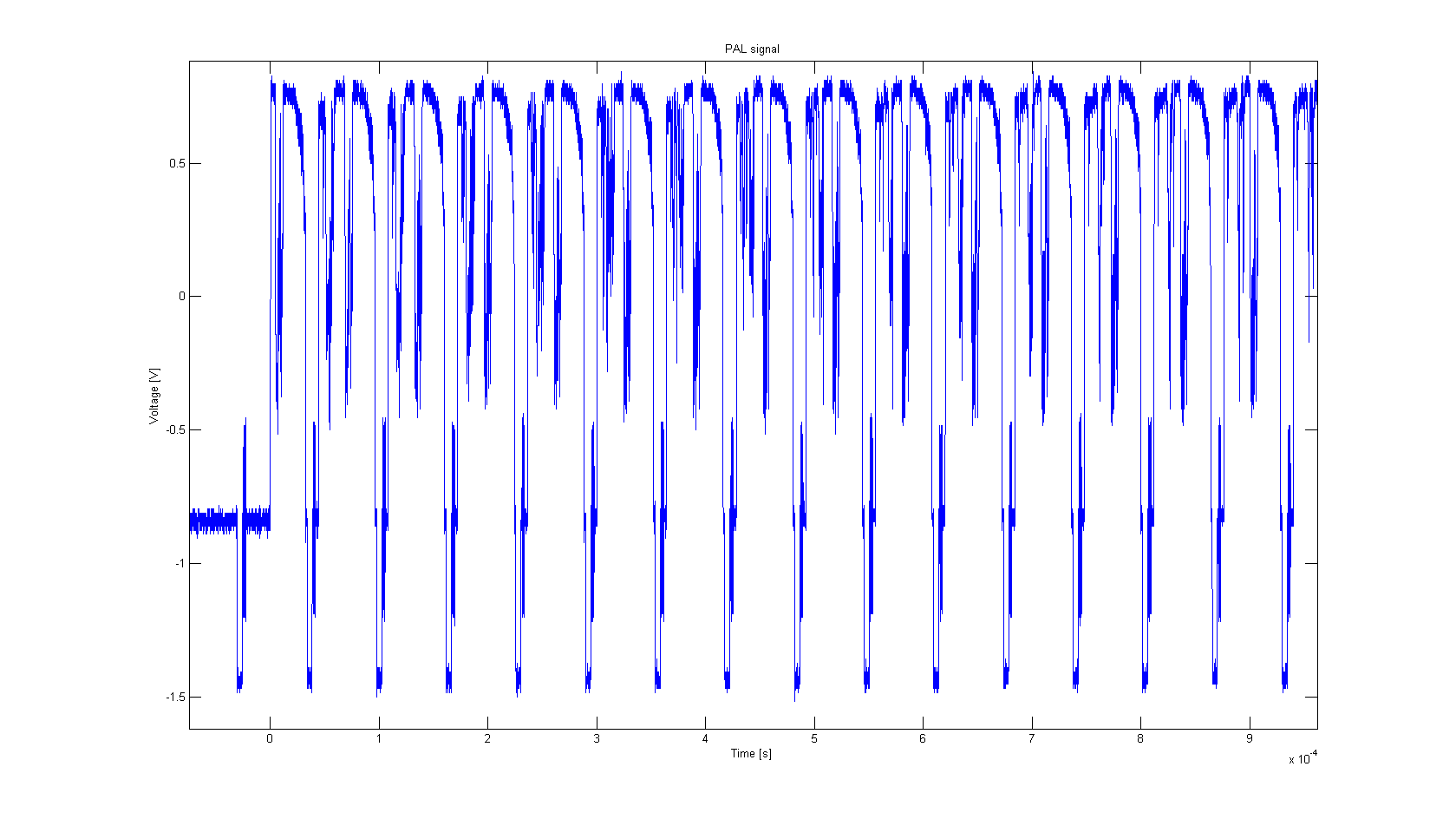
Oscillogram of composite PAL signal—several lines

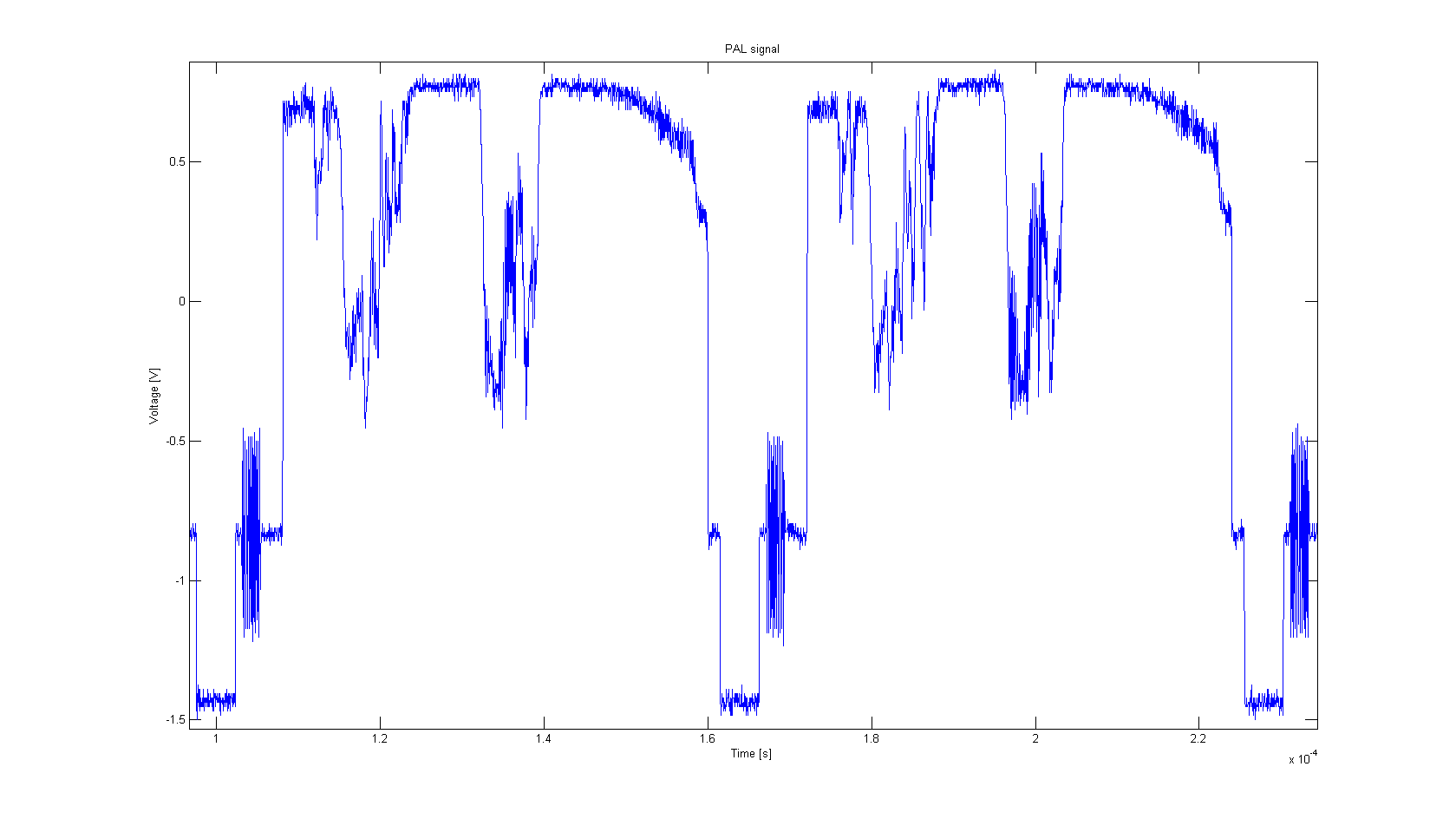
Oscillogram of composite PAL signal—two lines

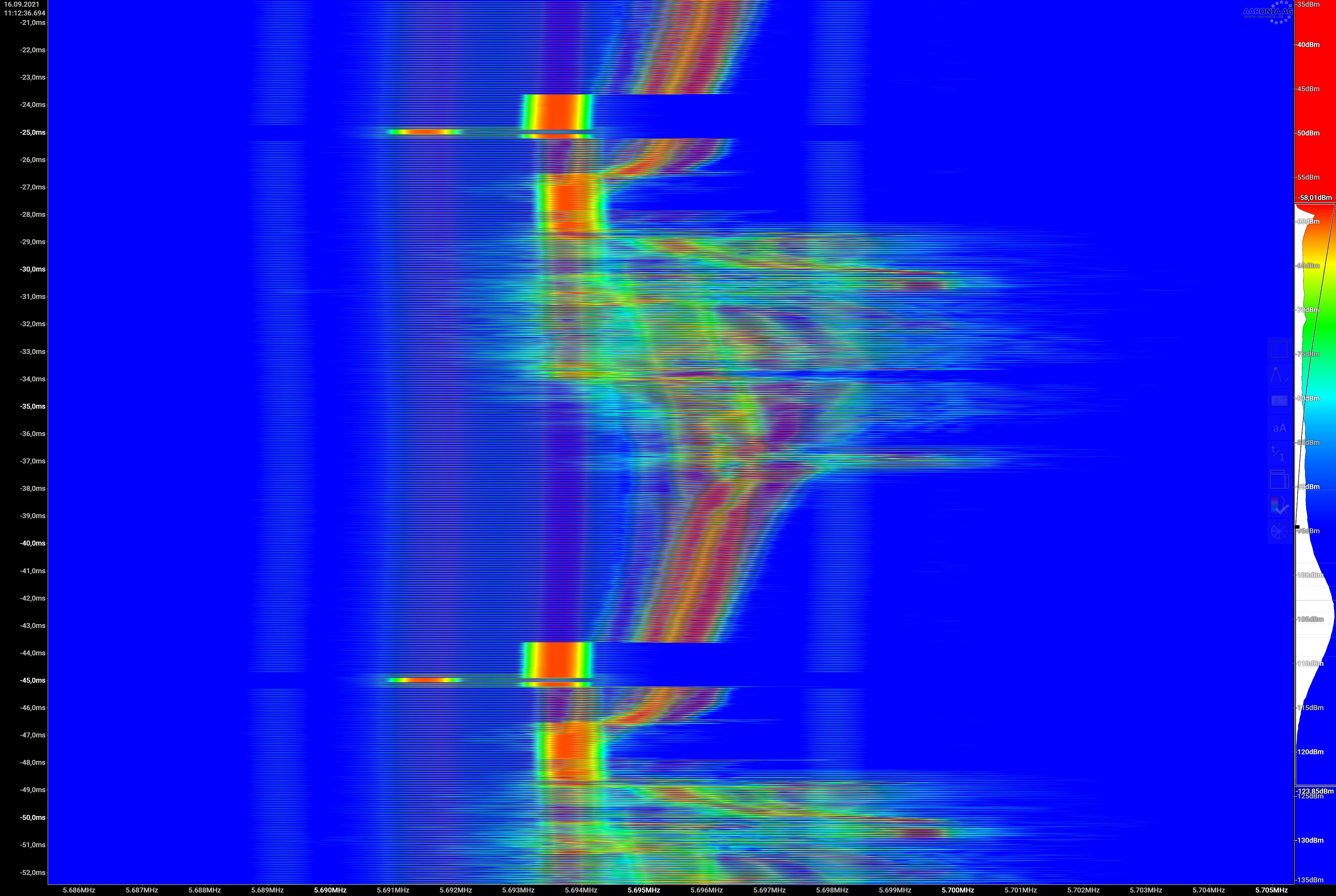
A waterfall display showing a 20ms long interlaced PAL frame with high FFT resolution

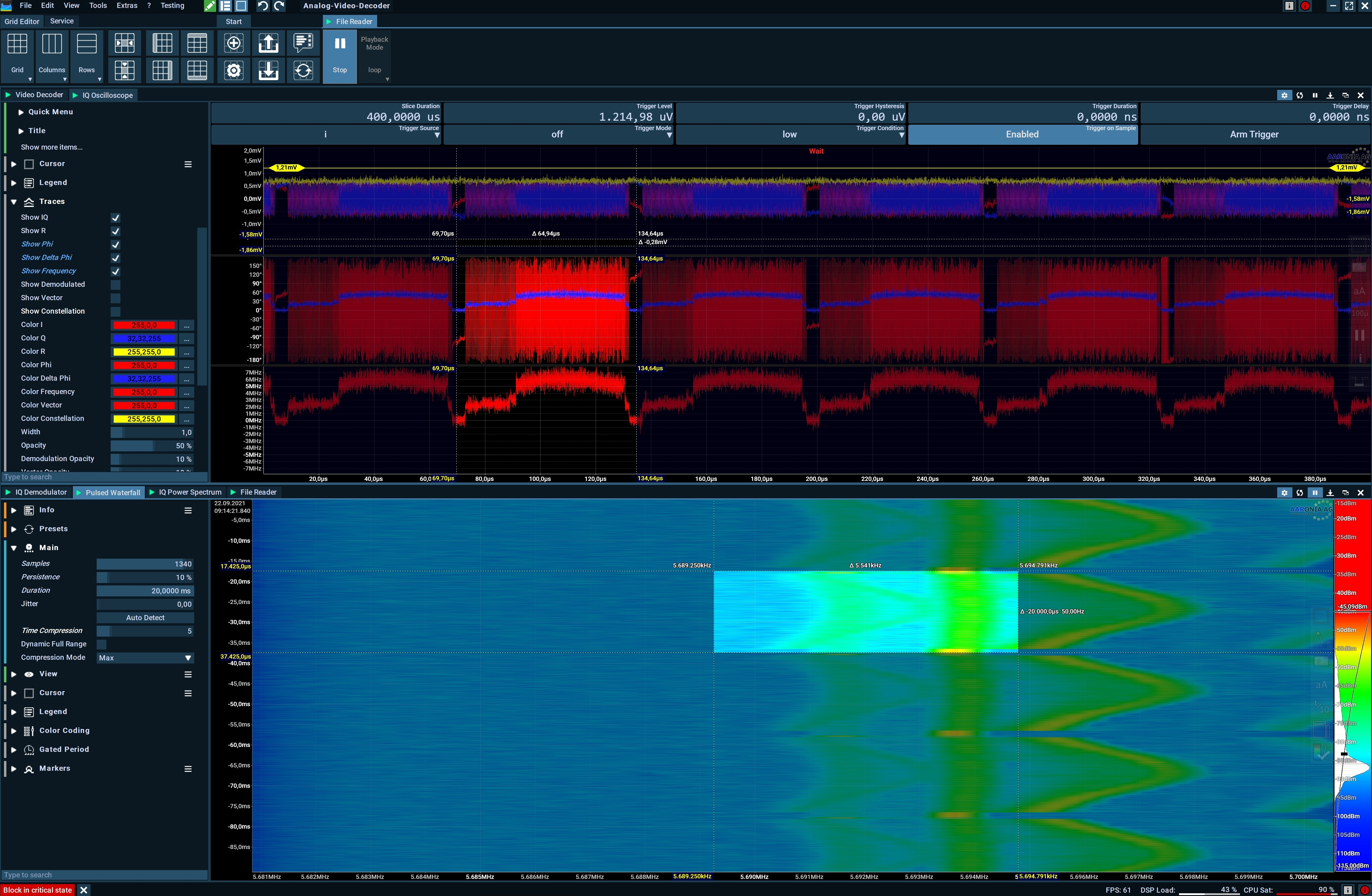
Analyzing a PAL signal and decoding the 20ms frame and 64 μs lines

The 4.43361875 MHz frequency of the colour carrier is a result of 283.75 colour clock cycles per line plus a 25 Hz offset to avoid interferences. Since the line frequency (number of lines per second) is 15625 Hz (625 lines × 50 Hz ÷ 2), the colour carrier frequency calculates as follows: 4.43361875 MHz = 283.75 × 15625 Hz + 25 Hz.

The frequency 50 Hz is the optional refresh frequency of the monitor to be able to create an illusion of motion, while 625 lines means the vertical lines or resolution that the PAL system supports.

The original colour carrier is required by the colour decoder to recreate the colour difference signals. Since the carrier is not transmitted with the video information it has to be generated locally in the receiver. In order that the phase of this locally generated signal can match the transmitted information, a 10-cycle burst of colour subcarrier is added to the video signal shortly after the line sync pulse, but before the picture information, during the so-called back porch. This colour burst is not actually in phase with the original colour subcarrier, but leads it by 45 degrees on the odd lines and lags it by 45 degrees on the even lines. This swinging burst enables the colour decoder circuitry to distinguish the phase of the $R-Y'$vector which reverses every line.

=== PAL signal details ===
For PAL-B/G the signal has these characteristics.

Parameter	Value
Bandwidth	5 MHz
Horizontal sync polarity	Negative
Total time for each line	64 μs
Front porch (A)	1.65+0.4 −0.1 μs
Sync pulse length (B)	4.7±0.20 μs
Back porch (C)	5.7±0.20 μs
Active video (D)	51.95+0.4 −0.1 μs

(Total horizontal sync time 12.05 μs)

After 0.9 μs a 2.25±0.23 μs colourburst of 10±1 cycles is sent. Most rise/fall times are in 250±50 ns range. Amplitude is 100% for white level, 30% for black, and 0% for sync.

The CVBS electrical amplitude is Vpp 1.0 V and impedance of 75 Ω.

The composite video (CVBS) signal used in systems M and N before combination with a sound carrier and modulation onto an RF carrier

The vertical timings are:

Parameter	Value
Vertical lines	312.5 (625 total)
Vertical lines visible	288 (576 total)
Vertical sync polarity	Negative (burst)
Vertical frequency	50 Hz
Sync pulse length (F)	0.576 ms (burst)
Active video (H)	18.4 ms

(Total vertical sync time 1.6 ms)

As PAL is interlaced, every two fields are summed to make a complete picture frame.

==== Colourimetry ====
PAL colourimetry, as defined by the ITU on REC-BT.470, and based on CIE 1931 x,y coordinates:

PAL colourimetry
Colour space	Standard	Year	White point		CCT	Primary colours (CIE 1931 xy)						Display gamma EOTF
Colour space	Standard	Year	x	y	k	R_{x}	R_{y}	G_{x}	G_{y}	B_{x}	B_{y}	Display gamma EOTF
PAL	EBU 3213-E, ITU-R BT.470/601 (B/G)	1967	0.3127	0.3290	6500 (D65)	0.64	0.33	0.29	0.60	0.15	0.06	2.8
PAL-M	ITU-R BT.470-6	1972	0.31	0.316	6774 (C)	0.67	0.33	0.21	0.71	0.14	0.08	2.8

The assumed display gamma is defined as 2.8. The PAL-M system uses colour primary and gamma values similar to NTSC. Colour is encoded using the YUV colour space.

Luma ($E'{\scriptstyle\text{Y}}$) is derived from red, green, and blue ($E'{\scriptstyle\text{R}}, E'{\scriptstyle\text{G}}, E'{\scriptstyle\text{B}}$) gamma pre-corrected ($E'$) primary signals:

- $E'{\scriptstyle\text{Y}}= 0.299E'{\scriptstyle\text{R}} + 0.587E'{\scriptstyle\text{G}} + 0.114E'{\scriptstyle\text{B}}$

$E'{\scriptstyle\text{U}}$ and $E'{\scriptstyle\text{V}}$ are used to transmit chrominance. Each has a typical bandwidth of 1.3 MHz.

- $E'{\scriptstyle\text{U}} = 0.492(E'{\scriptstyle\text{B}}-E'{\scriptstyle\text{Y}})$
- $E'{\scriptstyle\text{V}} = 0.877(E'{\scriptstyle\text{R}}-E'{\scriptstyle\text{Y}})$

Composite PAL signal $= E'{\scriptstyle\text{Y}} + E'{\scriptstyle\text{U}} \sin (\omega t) + E'{\scriptstyle\text{V}} \cos (\omega t) +$timing where $\omega = 2\pi F_{SC}$.

Subcarrier frequency $F_{SC}$ is 4.43361875 MHz (±5 Hz) for PAL-B/D/G/H/I/N.

== PAL broadcast systems ==
The PAL colour system is usually used with a video format that has 625 lines per frame (576 visible lines, the rest being used for other information such as sync data and captioning) and a refresh rate of 50 interlaced fields per second (compatible with 25 full frames per second), such systems being B, G, H, I, and N (see broadcast television systems for the technical details of each format).

This ensures video interoperability. However, as some of these standards (B/G/H, I, and D/K) use different sound carriers (5.5 MHz, 6.0 MHz, and 6.5 MHz respectively), it may result in a video image without audio when viewing a signal broadcast over the air or cable. Some countries in Eastern Europe which formerly used SECAM with systems D and K have switched to PAL while leaving other aspects of their video system the same, resulting in the different sound carrier. Instead, other European countries have changed completely from SECAM-D/K to PAL-B/G.

The PAL-N system has a different sound carrier, and also a different colour subcarrier, and decoding on incompatible PAL systems results in a black-and-white image without sound.

The PAL-M system has a different sound carrier and a different colour subcarrier, and does not use 625 lines or 50 frames/second. This would result in no video or audio at all when viewing a European signal.

Differences between PAL variants
	PAL B	PAL G, H	PAL I	PAL D/K, L	PAL N	PAL M
Transmission band	VHF	UHF	VHF/UHF			
Fields	50					59.94
Scan lines	625					525
Active lines	576					480
Channel bandwidth	7 MHz	8 MHz			6 MHz	
Video bandwidth	5.0 MHz		5.5 MHz	6.0 MHz	4.2 MHz	
Vision/Sound carrier spacing	5.5 MHz		6.0 MHz	6.5 MHz	4.5 MHz	
Colour Subcarrier	4.43361875 MHz				3.58205625 MHz	3.575611 MHz
Assumed Receiver; Gamma correction	2.8					2.2

=== System A ===
The BBC tested their pre-war (but still broadcast until 1985) 405-line monochrome system (CCIR System A) with all three colour standards including PAL, before the decision was made to abandon 405 and transmit colour on 625/System I only.

=== PAL-B/G/D/K/I ===
Many countries have turned off analogue transmissions, so the following does not apply anymore, except for using devices which output RF signals, such as video recorders.

The majority of countries using or having used PAL have television standards with 625 lines and 50 fields per second. Differences concern the audio carrier frequency and channel bandwidths. The variants are:

- Standards B/G are used in most of Western Europe, former Yugoslavia, South Asia, Thailand, Australia, and New Zealand
- Standard I in the UK, Ireland, Hong Kong, South Africa, and Macau
- Standards D/K (along with SECAM usually) in most of Central and Eastern Europe and mainland China.

Systems B and G are similar. System B specifies 7 MHz channel bandwidth, while System G specifies 8 MHz channel bandwidth. Australia and China used Systems B and D respectively for VHF and UHF channels. Similarly, Systems D and K are similar except for the bands they use: System D is only used on VHF, while System K is only used on UHF. Although System I is used on both bands, it has only been used on UHF in the United Kingdom.

=== PAL-L ===
The PAL-L (Phase Alternating Line with CCIR System L broadcast system) standard uses the same video system as PAL-B/G/H (625 lines, 50 Hz field rate, 15.625 kHz line rate), but with a larger 6 MHz video bandwidth rather than 5.5 MHz and moving the audio subcarrier to 6.5 MHz. An 8 MHz channel spacing is used for PAL-L, to maintain compatibility with System L channel spacings.

=== PAL-M (Brazil) ===
In Brazil, PAL is used in conjunction with the 525 line, 59.94 field/s CCIR System M, using (very nearly) the NTSC colour subcarrier frequency. Exact colour subcarrier frequency of PAL-M is 3.575611 MHz, or 227.25 times System M's horizontal scan frequency. Almost all other countries using system M use NTSC.

=== PAL-N (Argentina, Paraguay, and Uruguay) ===
The PAL-N standard was created in Argentina, through Resolution No. 100 ME/76, which determined the creation of a study commission for a national colour standard. The commission recommended using PAL under CCIR System N that Paraguay and Uruguay also used. It employs the 625 line/50 field per second waveform of PAL-B/G, D/K, H, and I, but on a 6 MHz channel with a chrominance subcarrier frequency of 3.582056 MHz (917/4*H) similar to NTSC (910/4*H). On the studio production level, standard PAL cameras and equipment were used, with video signals then transcoded to PAL-N for broadcast. This allows 625 line, 50 frames per second video to be broadcast in a 6 MHz channel, at some cost in horizontal resolution.

The PAL colour system (either baseband or with any RF system, with the normal 4.43 MHz subcarrier unlike PAL-M) can also be applied to an NTSC-like 525-line picture to form what is often known as "PAL 60" (sometimes "PAL 60/525", "Quasi-PAL" or "Pseudo PAL"). PAL-M (a broadcast standard) however should not be confused with "PAL 60" (a video playback system—see below).

== Home devices ==
=== Multisystem TVs ===
PAL television receivers manufactured since the 1990s can typically decode all of the PAL variants except, in some cases PAL-M and PAL-N. Many such receivers can also receive Eastern European and Middle Eastern SECAM, though rarely French-broadcast SECAM (because France used a quasi-unique positive video modulation, system L) unless they are manufactured for the French market. They will correctly display plain (non-broadcast) CVBS or S-Video SECAM signals. Many can also accept baseband NTSC-M, such as from a VCR or game console, and RF modulated NTSC with a PAL standard audio subcarrier (i.e., from a modulator), though not usually broadcast NTSC (as its 4.5 MHz audio subcarrier is not supported). Many sets also support NTSC with a 4.43 MHz colour subcarrier (see PAL 60 on the next section).

=== VHS and DVD players ===
VHS tapes recorded from a PAL-N or a PAL-B/G, D/K, H, or I broadcast are indistinguishable because the downconverted subcarrier on the tape is the same. A VHS recorded off TV (or released) in Europe will play in colour on any PAL-N VCR and PAL-N TV in Argentina, Paraguay, and Uruguay. Likewise, any tape recorded in Argentina, Paraguay or Uruguay off a PAL-N TV broadcast can be sent to anyone in European countries that use PAL (and Australia/New Zealand, etc.) and it will display in colour. This will also play back successfully in Russia and other SECAM countries, as the USSR mandated PAL compatibility in 1985—this has proved to be very convenient for video collectors.

People in Argentina, Paraguay, and Uruguay usually own TV sets that also display NTSC-M, in addition to PAL-N. DirecTV also conveniently broadcasts in NTSC-M for North, Central, and South America. Most DVD players sold in Argentina, Paraguay, and Uruguay also play PAL discs—however, this is usually output in the European variant (colour subcarrier frequency 4.433618 MHz), so people who own a TV set which only works in PAL-N (plus NTSC-M in most cases) will have to watch those PAL DVD imports in black and white (unless the TV supports RGB SCART) as the colour subcarrier frequency in the TV set is the PAL-N variation, 3.582056 MHz.

In the case that a VHS or DVD player works in PAL (and not in PAL-N) and the TV set works in PAL-N (and not in PAL), there are two options:

- images can be seen in black and white, or
- an inexpensive transcoder (PAL -> PAL-N) can be purchased in order to see the colours

Some DVD players (usually lesser known brands) include an internal transcoder and the signal can be output in NTSC-M, with some video quality loss due to the standard conversion from a 625/50 PAL DVD to the NTSC-M 525/60 output format. A few DVD players sold in Argentina, Paraguay, and Uruguay also allow a signal output of NTSC-M, PAL or PAL-N. In that case, a PAL disc (imported from Europe) can be played back on a PAL-N TV because there are no field/line conversions, quality is generally excellent.

Some special VHS video recorders are available which can allow viewers the flexibility of enjoying PAL-N recordings using a standard PAL (625/50 Hz) colour TV, or even through multi-system TV sets. Video recorders like Panasonic NV-W1E (AG-W1 for the US), AG-W2, AG-W3, NV-J700AM, Aiwa HV-M110S, HV-M1U, Samsung SV-4000W and SV-7000W feature a digital TV system conversion circuitry.

=== PAL 60 ===
Many 1990s-onwards videocassette recorders sold in Europe can play back NTSC tapes. When operating in this mode most of them do not output a true (625/50) PAL signal, but rather a hybrid consisting of the original NTSC line standard (525/60), with colour converted to PAL 4.43 MHz (instead of 3.58 as with NTSC and PAL-M) — this is known as "PAL 60" (also "quasi-PAL" or "pseudo-PAL") with "60" standing for 60 Hz (for 525/30), instead of 50 Hz (for 625/25).

Some video game consoles also output a signal in this mode. The Dreamcast pioneered PAL 60 with most of its games being able to play games at full speed like NTSC and without borders. Xbox and GameCube also support PAL 60 unlike PlayStation 2. The PlayStation 2 did not actually offer a true PAL 60 mode; while many PlayStation 2 games did offer a "PAL 60" mode as an option, the console would in fact generate an NTSC signal during 60 Hz operation.

Most newer television sets can display a "PAL 60" signal correctly, but some will only do so (if at all) in black and white and/or with flickering/foldover at the bottom of the picture, or picture rolling (however, many old TV sets can display the picture properly by means of adjusting the V-Hold and V-Height knobs—assuming they have them). Some TV tuner cards or video capture cards will support this mode (although software/driver modification can be required and the manufacturers' specs may be unclear).

Some DVD players offer a choice of PAL vs NTSC output for NTSC discs.

== PAL vs. NTSC ==
PAL usually has 576 visible lines compared with 480 lines with NTSC, meaning that PAL has a 20% higher resolution, in fact it even has a higher resolution than Enhanced Definition standard (852x480). Most TV output for PAL and NTSC use interlaced frames meaning that even lines update on one field and odd lines update on the next field. Interlacing frames gives a smoother motion with half the frame rate. NTSC is used with a frame rate of 60i or 30p whereas PAL generally uses 50i or 25p; both use a high enough frame rate to give the illusion of fluid motion. This is due to the fact that NTSC is generally used in countries with a utility frequency of 60 Hz and PAL in countries with 50 Hz, although there are many exceptions.

Both PAL and NTSC have a higher frame rate than film which uses 24 frames per second. PAL has a closer frame rate to that of film, so most films are sped up 4% to play on PAL systems, shortening the runtime of the film and, without adjustment, largely raising the pitch of the audio track. Film conversions for NTSC instead use 3:2 pull down to spread the 24 frames of film across 60 interlaced fields. This maintains the runtime of the film and preserves the original audio, but may cause worse interlacing artefacts during fast motion, along with judder.

NTSC receivers have a tint control to perform colour correction manually. If this is not adjusted correctly, the colours may be faulty. The PAL standard automatically cancels hue errors by phase reversal, so a tint control is unnecessary. Chrominance phase errors in the PAL system are cancelled out using a 1H delay line resulting in lower saturation, which is much less noticeable to the eye than NTSC hue errors.

However, the alternation of colour information—Hanover bars—can lead to picture grain on pictures with extreme phase errors even in PAL systems, if decoder circuits are misaligned or use the simplified decoders of early designs (typically to overcome royalty restrictions). This effect will usually be observed when the transmission path is poor, typically in built up areas or where the terrain is unfavourable. The effect is more noticeable on UHF than VHF signals as VHF signals tend to be more robust. In most cases such extreme phase shifts do not occur.

PAL and NTSC have slightly divergent colour spaces, but the colour decoder differences here are ignored.

Outside of film and TV broadcasts, the differences in both formats in the context of video games were quite dramatic. For comparison, the NTSC standard is 60 fields/30 frames per second while PAL is 50 fields/25 frames per second. To avoid timing problems or unfeasible code changes, games were slowed down by approximately 16.7%. This has led to games ported over to PAL regions being historically known for their inferior speed and frame rates compared to their NTSC counterparts, especially when they are not properly optimized for PAL standards.

Full-motion video rendered and encoded at 30 frames per second by the Japanese/US (NTSC) developers was often down-sampled to 25 frames per second or considered to be 50 frames per second video for PAL release—usually by means of 3:2 pull down, resulting in motion judder. In addition, the increased resolution of PAL was often not utilised at all during conversion, creating a pseudo-letterbox effect with borders on the top and bottom of the screen, looking similar to 14:9 letterbox. This leaves the graphics with a slightly squashed look due to an incorrect aspect ratio caused by the borders.

These practices above were especially prevalent during the 8-bit and 16-bit eras of video games when 2D graphics was the standard. Games with an emphasis on speed such as the original Sonic the Hedgehog for the Sega Genesis (Mega Drive) suffered in their PAL incarnations.

Beginning with the sixth generation of video games, game consoles started to offer true 60 Hz modes in games ported to PAL regions. The Dreamcast was the first to offer a true "PAL 60" mode, and many games made for the system in PAL regions were closely on-par with their NTSC counterparts in terms of speed and frame rates using "PAL 60" modes. Other consoles such as the Xbox and GameCube followed suit, implementing "PAL 60" modes in games made for the region as well. The only lone exception was the PlayStation 2, which did not have a native "PAL 60" mode and games ported over to the region were often (but not always) running in 50 Hz modes. PAL region games supporting 60 Hz modes for the PlayStation 2 also require a display with NTSC output unless RGB or component connections are used, since these allowed for colour outputs without the need for NTSC or PAL colour encoding. Otherwise, the games would display in monochrome on PAL-only displays.

These problems above are less prevalent in Brazil with the PAL-M standard used in that region, since its video system uses an identical number of visible lines and refresh rate as NTSC but with a slightly different colour encoding frequency based on PAL, modified for use with the CCIR System M broadcast television system.

== PAL vs. SECAM ==
The SECAM patents predate those of PAL by several years (1956 vs. 1962). Its creator, Henri de France, in search of a response to known NTSC hue problems, came up with ideas that were to become fundamental to both European systems, namely:

1. colour information on two successive TV lines is very similar and vertical resolution can be halved without serious impact on perceived visual quality
2. more robust colour transmission can be achieved by spreading information on two TV lines instead of just one
3. information from the two TV lines can be recombined using a delay line.

SECAM applies those principles by transmitting alternately only one of the U and V components on each TV line, and getting the other from the delay line. QAM is not required, and frequency modulation of the subcarrier is used instead for additional robustness (sequential transmission of U and V was to be reused much later in Europe's last "analog" video systems: the MAC standards).

SECAM is free of both hue and saturation errors. It is not sensitive to phase shifts between the colour burst and the chrominance signal, and for this reason was sometimes used in early attempts at colour video recording, where tape speed fluctuations could get the other systems into trouble. In the receiver, it did not require a quartz crystal (which was an expensive component at the time) and generally could do with lower accuracy delay lines and components.

SECAM transmissions are more robust over longer distances than NTSC or PAL. However, owing to their FM nature, the colour signal remains present, although at reduced amplitude, even in monochrome portions of the image, thus being subject to stronger cross colour.

One serious drawback for studio work is that the addition of two SECAM signals does not yield valid colour information, due to its use of frequency modulation. It was necessary to demodulate the FM and handle it as AM for proper mixing, before finally remodulating as FM, at the cost of some added complexity and signal degradation. In its later years, this was no longer a problem, due to the wider use of component and digital equipment.

PAL can work without a delay line (PAL-S), but this configuration, sometimes referred to as "poor man's PAL", could not match SECAM in terms of picture quality. To compete with it at the same level, it had to make use of the main ideas outlined above, and as a consequence PAL had to pay licence fees to SECAM. Over the years, this contributed significantly to the estimated 500 million francs gathered by the SECAM patents (for an initial 100 million francs invested in research).

Hence, PAL could be considered as a hybrid system, with its signal structure closer to NTSC, but its decoding borrowing much from SECAM.

There were initial specifications to use colour with the French 819 line format (system E). However, "SECAM E" only ever existed in development phases. Actual deployment used the 625 line format. This made for easy interchange and conversion between PAL and SECAM in Europe. Conversion was often not even needed, as more and more receivers and VCRs became compliant with both standards, helped in this by the common decoding steps and components. When the SCART plug became standard, it could take RGB as an input, effectively bypassing all the colour coding formats' peculiarities.

When it comes to home VCRs, all video standards use what is called "colour under" format. Colour is extracted from the high frequencies of the video spectrum, and moved to the lower part of the spectrum available from tape. Luma then uses what remains of it, above the colour frequency range. This is usually done by heterodyning for PAL (as well as NTSC). But the FM nature of colour in SECAM allows for a cheaper trick: division by 4 of the subcarrier frequency (and multiplication on replay). This became the standard for SECAM VHS recording in France. Most other countries kept using the same heterodyning process as for PAL or NTSC and this is known as MESECAM recording (as it was more convenient for some Middle East countries that used both PAL and SECAM broadcasts).

Another difference in colour management is related to the proximity of successive tracks on the tape, which is a cause for chroma crosstalk in PAL. A cyclic sequence of 90° chroma phase shifts from one line to the next is used to overcome this problem. This is not needed in SECAM, as FM provides sufficient protection.

Regarding early (analogue) videodiscs, the established Laserdisc standard supported only NTSC and PAL. However, a different optical disc format, the Thomson transmissive optical disc made a brief appearance on the market. At some point, it used a modified SECAM signal (single FM subcarrier at 3.6 MHz). The media's flexible and transmissive material allowed for direct access to both sides without flipping the disc, a concept that reappeared in multi-layered DVDs about fifteen years later.

== Countries and territories using PAL, past and present ==
A legacy list of PAL users in 1998 is available on Recommendation ITU-R BT.470-6 - Conventional Television Systems, Appendix 1 to Annex 1.

=== Using PAL B, D, G, H, K or I ===
- Afghanistan (used SECAM)
- Algeria
- Angola
- Bahrain (DVB-T introduction in assessment)
- Bhutan
- Botswana
- British Indian Ocean Territory
- Cameroon
- Cape Verde
- Christmas Island
- Comoros
- Cook Islands (see New Zealand)
- Djibouti
- Equatorial Guinea
- Eritrea
- Eswatini
- Falkland Islands (UHF only)
- Fiji
- Gambia
- Guinea-Bissau
- Iraq (DVB-T introduction in assessment)
- Kiribati
- Laos (Once experimented in PAL-M)
- Lebanon
- Lesotho
- Liberia
- Libya
- Malawi
- Maldives
- Mozambique
- Myanmar (Unofficially, only for non-terrestrial)
- Nauru
- Nepal
- Niue
- Norfolk Island (see Australia)
- North Korea (used SECAM until 1990s)
- Oman (DVB-T introduction in assessment)
- Palestine (DVB-T introduction in assessment)
- Saint Helena, Ascension and Tristan da Cunha (two PAL-I analogue TV services operated by BFBS)
- Samoa
- São Tomé and Príncipe
- Seychelles
- Sierra Leone
- Solomon Islands
- Somalia
- South Africa (Simulcast in DVB-T)
- South Sudan
- Sri Lanka
- Sudan
- Syria (along with SECAM)
- Tanzania
- Timor-Leste
- Tonga (Simulcast in DVB-T)
- Turkey
- Tuvalu
- Vanuatu
- Yemen (DVB-T introduction in assessment)
- Zimbabwe

=== PAL-M ===
- Brazil (Note: Simulcast in ISDB-Tb started on 2 December 2007. PAL broadcasting in its final stages of abandonment, the complete shutdown was scheduled for 30 June 2025.)

=== PAL-N ===
- Paraguay (Simulcast in ISDB-Tb), plans to turn off analog fully in 2029; analog blackout has already happened in part of the country.
- Uruguay (Simulcast in ISDB-Tb)

=== Countries and territories no longer using PAL ===
Country	Switched to	Switchover completed
Albania	DVB-T2	1 October 2019
Andorra	DVB-T	25 September 2007
Argentina	DVB-T	31 March 2026
Armenia	DVB-T	30 September 2025
Australia	DVB-T	10 December 2013
Austria	DVB-T and DVB-T2	7 June 2011
Azerbaijan	DVB-T	17 June 2015
Bangladesh	DVB-T	30 November 2024
Belgium	DVB-T	1 March 2010
Bosnia and Herzegovina	DVB-T	31 December 2024
Brazil	DVB-T	30 June 2025
Brunei	DVB-T	1 January 2015
Bulgaria	DVB-T	30 September 2013
Burkina Faso	DVB-T2	6 December 2014
Cambodia	DVB-T2	1 January 2015
China	DTMB	31 March 2021
Croatia	DVB-T2	12 November 2020
Cyprus	DVB-T	1 July 2011
Czech Republic	DVB-T and DVB-T2	30 June 2012
Denmark	DVB-T and DVB-T2	1 November 2009
Egypt	DVB-T and DVB-T2	30 September 2024
Estonia	DVB-T	1 July 2010
Ethiopia	DVB-T	31 October 2025
Faroe Islands	DVB-T	1 December 2002
Finland	DVB-T and DVB-T2	1 September 2007
Georgia	DVB-T	1 July 2015
Germany	DVB-T and DVB-T2	3 August 2003
Ghana	DVB-T2	17 June 2015
Greece	DVB-T	6 February 2015
Gibraltar	DVB-T	31 December 2012
Guernsey	DVB-T	17 November 2010
Hong Kong	DTMB	1 December 2020
Hungary	DVB-T and DVB-T2	31 October 2013
Iceland	DVB-T and DVB-T2	2 February 2015
India	DVB-T	31 March 2015
Indonesia	DVB-T2	12 August 2023
Iran	DVB-T	19 December 2014
Iraq	DVB-T	16 December 2015
Ireland	DVB-T	24 October 2012
Isle of Man	DVB-T	24 October 2012
Israel	DVB-T and DVB-T2	13 June 2011
Italy	DVB-T	4 July 2012
Jersey	DVB-T	17 November 2010
Jordan	DVB-T	30 September 2025
Kenya	DVB-T	13 March 2015
Kosovo	DVB-T2	7 June 2015
Kuwait	DVB-T	31 December 2025
Laos	DVB-T	1 August 2011
Latvia	DVB-T	1 June 2010
Lithuania	DVB-T	29 October 2012
Luxembourg	DVB-T	1 September 2006
Macau	DTMB	30 June 2023
North Macedonia	DVB-T	31 May 2013
Malaysia	DVB-T2	31 October 2019
Malta	DVB-T	31 October 2011
Mauritius	DVB-T	30 September 2025
Monaco	DVB-T	24 May 2011
Moldova	DVB-T	31 December 2024
Mongolia	DVB-T	20 December 2024
Montenegro	DVB-T	17 June 2015
Namibia	DVB-T	13 September 2014
Netherlands	DVB-T	14 December 2006
New Zealand	DVB-T	1 December 2013
Nigeria	DVB-T	15 December 2024
Norway	DVB-T	1 December 2009
Paraguay	DVB-T	1 January 2025
Papua New Guinea	DVB-T	1 November 2025
Poland	DVB-T2	23 July 2013
Portugal	DVB-T	26 April 2012
Qatar	DVB-T and DVB-T2	13 February 2012
Romania	DVB-T2	31 December 2016
Rwanda	DVB-T	March 2014
South Africa	DVB-T	26 March 2015
Russia	DVB-T	1 November 2016
San Marino	DVB-T	2 December 2010
Saudi Arabia	DVB-T and DVB-T2	13 February 2012
Serbia	DVB-T2	7 June 2015
Singapore	DVB-T2	2 January 2019
Slovakia	DVB-T	31 December 2012
Slovenia	DVB-T	1 December 2010
Spain	DVB-T and DVB-T2	3 April 2010
Sweden	DVB-T and DVB-T2	29 October 2007
Switzerland	DVB-T	26 November 2007
Syria	DVB-T	2 April 2019
Thailand	DVB-T2	26 March 2020
Turkey	DVB-T	2 April 2019
Uganda	DVB-T	1 November 2025
Ukraine	DVB-T and DVB-T2	31 December 2016
United Arab Emirates	DVB-T and DVB-T2	13 February 2012
United Kingdom	DVB-T (SD) and DVB-T2 (HD)	24 October 2012
Vatican City	DVB-T	31 December 2010
Vietnam	DVB-T2	28 December 2020
Zambia	DVB-T2	31 December 2014

== See also ==
- Prewar television stations
- Broadcast-safe
- D1 SMPTE
- D-2 (video)
