= Zero reference pulse =

Signal transmitted for test purposes in TV transmitters

Zero reference pulse or Zero pulse is an artificially produced pulse in a professional television receiver imitating no radio frequency case for modulation index measurements in analogue TV transmitters.

== Video signal ==
The composite monochrome video signal (CVS) is composed of a video signal superimposed on an auxiliary signal of 300 mV. The levels between 0 and 300 mV are assigned for the auxiliary signal and the levels between 300 and 1000 mV are assigned to video information.

== Modulation ==
In analogue broadcasting the composite video signal modulates the carrier by a type of amplitude modulation named VSB. The polarity of the modulation is negative, i.e., higher the level of the CVS, lower the level of the RF signal. If the level of CVS is 0 volt the level of the RF signal is % 100. The modulation index is so arranged that, the maximum level of CVS yields a RF level of % 10 (sometimes % 12.5). This value is known as the level of the residual carrier. If the modulation index yields more than % 10 for maximum level input (high residual carrier), the efficiency of the transmission drops, i.e., low contrast. On the other hand, if the RF level is below % 10 (low residual carrier), aural and visual signals begin to interfere each other. So it is important to keep %10 for 1000 mV input.

== Measurement ==
Left: Input CVS (1000 mV., sawtooth) – Right: Demodulated output with zero ref pulse

To adjust the modulation index, an input of maximum level CVS (1000 mV) is applied to the modulator. The modulated RF signal is then applied to a professional TV receiver . The receiver has a facility to switch off RF for a short interval in each consecutive line. So during this interval, modulation ratio is effectively 0%. The interruption on all lines in a frame is observed as a vertical white bar on a visual monitor. This bar is named as 0 reference pulse (or simply 0 pulse). The oscillogram of the 0 pulse is a pulse with a level more than the maximum level of the CVS. Taking the level difference between the sync tip and the 0 pulse as % 100, the maximum CVS should be 10% or 12.5%. The adjustment of the modulation index is simply the level adjustment of the modulating signal (CVS) at the input of the modulator.
