= Downlink CNR =

Fıgure used in satellite communication systems

Downlink CNR (Carrier to noise ratio in satellite reception) is an important figure in system TVRO design. Below are certain parameters used in CNR computation.

== Figure of merit ==
Figure of merit is given as

$$f=\frac{g}{t}$$

Where t is the temperature and g is the gain of the receiver antenna. For lossless case

$$t=t_a+(n-1)\cdot t_0$$

and

$$f=\frac{g}{ t_a+(n-1)\cdot t_0}$$

where n is the noise factor, t_{a} is the noise temperature of the antenna and t_{0} is the temperature of the environment (taken as 290^{0}K). F in db is simply

$$F= 10 \ \log_{10} (f)$$

== Path loss ==
Path loss is defined as

$$l=  (\frac{4\cdot \pi \cdot d}{\lambda})^2$$

Where $\lambda$ is the wavelength of the carrier and the d is the distance in meters between the satellite and the receiver. For Geosynchronous satellites this distance is 35,786 kilometres (22,236 mi) at the projection on the earth (at the mean sea level). In actual cases the distance is slightly more than this figure depending on the geographic location. (But for geosynchronous satellites the variation is less than 1%). The Path loss in dB is

$$L = 20\ \log_{10}\left(\frac{4\cdot \pi \cdot d}{\lambda}\right)$$

The same relation can be given in terms of frequency.

$$L = 20\ \log_{10}\left(\frac{4\cdot \pi \cdot d \cdot f}{c}\right)$$

Where c is the velocity of light.

With metric units

$$L= -147.56+20\ \log_{10} (d) +20\ \log_{10} (f)$$

Using km for d and GHz for f

$$L= 92.45 + 20\ \log_{10} (d) +20\ \log_{10} (f)$$

Using miles for d and GHz for f

$$L= 96.58+20\ \log_{10} (d) +20\ \log_{10} (f)$$

== EIRP ==
P_{e} is the Equivalent isotropically radiated power (also known as EIRP) in dBW. It depends on the output of the transponders of the satellite and the antenna gain of the transmitting antenna. This figure is given by the service provider.

$$P_e= 10\ \log_{10} (p) + 10\ \log_{10} (g_{t})$$

where p is the output power of the transponder and g is the antenna gain.

== Baseband ==
B is the baseband of the channel given in dB

$$B= 10\ \log_{10} (b)$$

Where b is the base band given in metric units (Hz).

When b is given in MHz, than

$$B= 10\ \log_{10} (b)+60$$

== Boltzmann constant ==
K is the Boltzmann constant given in dB units.

$$K= 10\ \log_{10} (1.380 \cdot 10^{-23})= -228.6$$

== CNR in dB units ==
$$\mbox{CNR}= figure of merit + EIRP - free space path loss + 228.6$$
