= Frequency offset =

Intentional frequency shift in broadcasting

In radio engineering, a frequency offset is an intentional slight shift of the broadcast radio frequency (RF), to reduce interference with other transmitters. Carrier frequency offset arises from mismatches between the received signal's carrier frequency and the receiver's local oscillator, often due to synchronization errors and Doppler shifts.

== Interference ==
The most important problem encountered in broadcasting via terrestrial transmitters is the interference from other broadcasters. In principle, each broadcaster has a different radio frequency (planned by the public authority) in a common reception area to avoid interference from each other. However, there are still two problems: spurious radiation of adjacent channels and fringe reception.

Fringe reception is unintended reception under certain weather conditions. The exceptionally long-range reception means that the receiver may be tuned to more than one transmitter (transmitting at same frequency) at the same time. These transmitters may transmit programs of different broadcasters as well as the programs of the same broadcaster. In analogue transmission, even the transmitters transmitting the very same program interfere each other because of phase differences of the incoming signal, but in digital transmission the transmitters transmitting the same program in the same channel may reinforce each other.

== The shift in RF ==
In order to reduce the interference from the fringe area transmitters transmitting in the same channels, a method named frequency offset is often used. By this method, a slightly shifted RF is assigned for a transmitter which may experience interference from other transmitters.

In TV transmission, the shifted RF is calculated by the formula;

$$f_{os} = f_{ch} + \frac{f_L\cdot p}{12}$$

where,

$f_{os}$ is the offset RF,
$f_{ch}$ is the standard channel frequency,
$p$ is an integer such that $-12<p<0$ or $0>p>12$
$f_L$ is the line frequency. (15625 Hz. for 625-line systems, 15750 Hz. for System M and System J and 20475 Hz. for system E)

Precision offset is the same as frequency offset, except that in this case, the offset frequency is produced by a cesium controlled oscillator.

== Example ==
8p offset of channel 9 in system B can be found readily

The standard visual carrier frequency is 203.25 MHz The line frequency is 15.625 Hz.

$$f_{os} = 203 250 000 + \frac{15626\cdot 8}{12} \approx 203260417$$

8n offset of the same channel is likewise

$$f_{os} = 203 250 000 - \frac{15626\cdot 8}{12} \approx 203239583$$
