= Residual carrier =

Term used in analog TV broadcasting

In analogue TV technology, residual carrier is the ratio of carrier level which is modulated by the maximum video signal to the unmodulated carrier level.

== Video signal ==
Video signal (VF) or more formally composite video signal (CVS) is the signal which carries the video information as well as some auxiliary signals for synchronizing. In all systems 0–300 mV level is reserved for auxiliary signals and 300–1000 mV is reserved for video information. In monochrome TV, 300 mV (or sometimes 350 mV) corresponds to black and 1000 mV corresponds to white.( In color TV depending on the system used, superimposed color subcarrier may have slightly higher values.)

== Modulation ==
The signal modulates a carrier by vestigal sideband modulation (a version of amplitude modulation), where an increase in the video modulating signal produces a decrease in the carrier amplitude, called "negative modulation". When there is no modulating signal, the carrier has the full level and when there is a modulating video frequency (VF) signal the level of IF is lower. Since the level when transmitting a black scene is lower than the white level, the level of carrier when transmitting black is higher than the level of carrier when transmitting white.

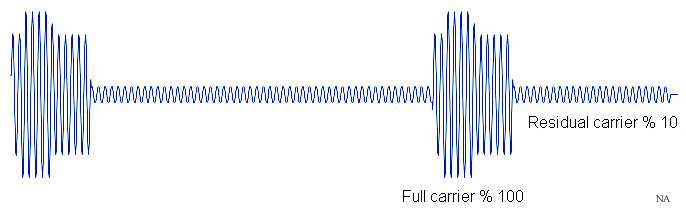
Carrier modulated by 1 Volt VF. (1 volt corresponds to white.) In this illustration, the carrier frequency is much lower than would practically be used, relative to the video signal frequency.

The modulators are set to yield 10% or 12.5% of carrier level when modulated by 1 V signal (which corresponds to white scene) This percentage is known as residual carrier.

An example of the modulated carrier is shown in the accompanying figure. In this figure, the level of the modulating VF signal is 1 volt (white level). 1 V yields residual carrier (10%). Short duration full carrier (100%) is the sync pulse and the 73% is so called back porch (black level). The duration of the signal is approximately 100 μs.

== See also ==
- Carrier wave
- White clipper
- Zero reference pulse
