= Field strength meter =

Measurement device used in telecommunications

In telecommunications, a field strength meter is an instrument that measures the electric field strength emanating from a transmitter.

== The relation between the electric field and the transmitted power ==
In ideal free space, the electric field strength produced by a transmitter with an isotropic radiator is readily calculated.

$$\mbox{E} \approx \frac{ \sqrt{30 \cdot P}}{d}$$

where

$\mbox{E}$ is the electric field strength in volts per meter
$P$ is the transmitter power output in watts
$d$ is the distance from the radiator in meters

The factor $\sqrt{30}$ is an approximation of $\sqrt{\frac{Z_0}{4\pi}}$

where $Z_0=376.730 313 668(57)$ $\Omega\quad$is the impedance of free space. $\Omega$ is the symbol for ohms.

It is clear that electric field strength is inversely proportional to the distance between the transmitter and the receiver. However, this relation is impractical for calculating the field strength produced by terrestrial transmitters, where reflections and attenuation caused by objects around the transmitter or receiver may affect the electrical field strength considerably.

== Field strength meter ==
A field strength meter is actually a simple receiver. The RF signal is detected and fed to a microammeter, which is scaled in dBμ. The frequency range of the tuner is usually within the terrestrial broadcasting bands. Some FS meters can also receive satellite (TVRO and RRO) frequencies. Most modern FS meters have AF and VF circuits and can be used as standard receivers. Some FS meters are also equipped with printers to record received field strength.

== Antennas ==
When measuring with a field strength meter it is important to use a calibrated antenna such as the standard antenna supplied with the meter. For precision measurements the antenna must be at a standard height. A value of standard height frequently employed for VHF and UHF measurements is 10 metres (33 ft). Gain correction tables may be provided with the meter, that take into account the change of antenna gain with frequency.

== Minimum field strength criteria ==
The CCIR defines the minimum field strength for satisfactory reception. These are shown in the table below. (Band II is reserved for FM radio broadcasting and the other bands are reserved for TV broadcasting.)

Frequency band	Minimum field strength in dBμV/m	Notes
Band I	48	
Band III	55	
Band IV	65	
Band V	70	
Band II	48	Rural area
Band II	60	Urban area
Band II	70	Large towns
