= PAL-S =

Abandoned colour TV system

PAL-S is the system of television receiver sets in the early days of the PAL system. Here PAL stands for Phase alternating at line rate and S stands for simple.

== PAL system ==
The color hue modulates the phase of a subcarrier named color carrier. In PAL system the polarity of the phase in each frame is reversed to neutralize the undesirable phase shifts introduced during transmission. Thus the effect of undesirable phase shift is positive in one frame and negative in the second frame. Averaging the two, the effect of the undesirable phase shifts in two consecutive frames cancel each other.

== The PAL-S receiver ==
In the early days of the PAL system, it was proposed that, the human eye can average the slightly different color hues in two consecutive frames and perceive the original color. The television receiver sets which rely on optical averaging were called PAL-S receivers.

== The problems in PAL-S ==
However, it soon turned out that the optical averaging had problems. When the distance between the viewer and the receiver set is not large, the viewer can distinguish the lines. The phase reversion takes place in every frame. But each frame is composed of two fields. So the viewer watches two consecutive lines without reversion. The next two lines are reverted phase lines. That means that when there is undesired phase shift the viewer watches a thin horizontal bar with one color and another thin bar with another color. This pattern is known as Hanover bar.

== Electronic averaging ==
In the standard analogue PAL receiver, the color differences between the consecutive bars are averaged electronically (by the use of delay line). This system is known as PAL-D.

== See also ==
- Differential gain
- Differential phase
