= VF bandwidth =

Video bandwidth in telecommunication

In broadcast television systems, VF bandwidth, video bandwidth or more formally video frequency bandwidth is the range of frequencies between 0 and the highest frequency used to transmit a live television image. The maximum frequency can be found by multiplying three figures; the number of frames (images) per second, number of lines per frame and maximum number of sine periods per line. In the table below number of frames per second, number of lines per frame and the video band width in different systems are shown.

Name of the systems	No of frames per second	No of lines per frame	Video bandwidth, MHz.
A	25	405	3
B-C-G-H	25	625	5
D-K-L	25	625	6
E	25	819	10
M-J	30	525	4.2
N	25	625	4.2
