= Dipole field strength in free space =

Dipole field strength in free space, in telecommunications, is the electric field strength caused by a half wave dipole under ideal conditions. The actual field strength in terrestrial environments is calculated by empirical formulas based on this field strength.

== Power density ==
Let N be the effective power radiated from an isotropic antenna and p be the power density at a distance d from this source

$$\mbox{p} = \frac{N}{4\cdot \pi \cdot d^2}$$

Power density is also defined in terms of electrical field strength;

Let E be the electrical field and Z be the impedance of the free space

$$\mbox{p} = \frac{E^2}{Z}$$

The following relation is obtained by equating the two,

$$\frac{N}{4\cdot \pi \cdot d^2}= \frac{E^2}{Z}$$

or by rearranging the terms

$$\mbox{E} =\frac{\sqrt{N} \cdot\sqrt{Z}}{2\cdot \sqrt{\pi}\cdot d}$$

== Numerical values ==
Impedance of free space is roughly $120 \pi ~ \Omega$

Since a half wave dipole is used, its gain over an isotropic antenna ($\mbox{2.15 dBi} = 1.64$ ) should also be taken into consideration,

$$\mbox{E} =\frac{\sqrt{1.64 \cdot N} \cdot  \sqrt{ 120\cdot \pi}}{2\cdot \sqrt{\pi}\cdot d}
\approx 7\cdot\frac{ \sqrt{N}}{d}$$

In this equation SI units are used.

Expressing the same equation in:

kW instead of W in power,
km instead of m in distance and
mV/m instead of V/m in electric field

is equivalent to multiplying the expression on the right by $\sqrt{1000}$. In this case,

$$\mbox{E} \approx 222\cdot\frac{\sqrt{N}}{d}$$

== See also ==
- Antenna (radio)
- Effective radiated power
- Electric field
- Field strength meter
- Radio propagation model
