= 800 MHz frequency band =

The 800 MHz frequency band is a portion of the electromagnetic spectrum, or frequency band, that encompasses 790–862 MHz.

Being a part of the spectrum known as "UHF Bands IV and V" (i.e. 470 MHz to 862 MHz) it was allocated by the ITU to Broadcasting as the primary user in Region 1 and was used for analogue television broadcasting before changing to digital terrestrial television in many countries. (Note: The 'Mobile Service' in ITU terms, not to be confused with mobile phone operators, was allocated as a secondary user of the band) As such it is also referred to as "digital dividend" spectrum. In Europe and to some extent elsewhere, the band corresponds to UHF channel 61–69. In most territories the band was also used by Services Ancillary to Broadcasting (SAB) or Services Ancillary to Programme Making (SAP), both often now referred to as PMSE (Programme Making and Special Events) in the form of professional wireless microphones, radio talkback systems and wireless monitor systems.

The European Parliament approved in May 2010, and Japan in 2012, the change of use of the 800 MHz band making it available for purposes other than broadcasting (television) – e.g. mobile broadband.

From the year 2013 the 800 MHz band can be used to deliver wireless broadband services, in Europe.

== Possible interference problems ==
Some claim that there have not been enough interference studies made in the EU.

The reason for the interference problem is that the RF chain in TV-equipment is designed to receive 470–862 MHz (EU channels 21–69) and therefore includes the range of frequencies which the new services are, or will be, using. Most TV receiving equipment in current use and currently on the market was not designed with the expectation that there would be anything but TV signals in the frequency range 470 MHz to 862 MHz. Due to the very limited guard band between the new services and the existing TV services in some cases the LTE 800 base station signals may cause interference to DTT particularly in EU channels 59 and 60.

Strong LTE base station signals in 800 MHz band, may cause limiting or clipping, that is due to overdrive in antenna amplifiers and/or DTT tuners in e.g. flat panels, set top boxes, USB-tuners and digital video recorders.

Depending on the dynamic range performance of the affected receiving equipment, the following may happen:

- When forward error correction (FEC) is adequate, the TV reception will be unaffected
- If the interference is sufficiently severe such that FEC cannot correct all of the errors, there will be pixelation in the picture and/or there will be sound drop-outs.
- In severe cases of interference the error correction will not cope at all and this will result in a black TV-screen and / or complete loss of sound.

Overload in the RF chain will not only affect one TV channel. All signals passing through the overloaded device will be affected for as long as the device remains overloaded.

Essentially there are two types of interference sources in the 800 MHz band: The LTE base stations and the mobile terminals — handsets, tablets, dongles — which are sometimes close to TV equipment. Although the base stations may be relatively far away from the TV equipment they may be adjacent to the TV antenna, or if further away they may be in the 'beam' of the TV antenna, i.e. in the direction which the TV antenna points, and considerably closer than the TV transmitter which it is desired to receive resulting in a high level of interfering signal in the TV system. In the case of apartments, hotels, schools, colleges, offices, etc. with communal TV antenna systems the base station may be very close indeed, even on the same roof.

For the time being there are not many terminals in the European market that use the LTE 800 frequency band but this is increasing rapidly.

In the UK an organisation (Digital Mobile Spectrum Limited (DMSL), known as "at800") was set up specifically to mitigate any interference from the new LTE 800 services to TV reception in the UK.

== "Channel 70" interference ==
The frequency band between 862 MHz to 870 MHz, or a subset of this band, e.g. 863 MHz to 865 MHz, is sometimes referred to as 'Channel 70'. 862 MHz to 870 MHz is itself divided into many smaller sub-bands used in many territories by vast numbers of a wide range of different low power radio devices, often on a licence exempt basis (Historically it has also been used in Italy for TV broadcasting, one example being Telequattro transmitting on that channel from Castaldia, province of Pordenone, prior to the analog TV switch off). For example, 863 MHz to 865 MHz is used in many European countries by cordless audio devices such as some cordless headphones, assistive listening devices (used by the hard of hearing) and some wireless microphones.

Any low power radio devices operating in the range 862 MHz to 870 MHz are most likely to be affected by interference from the portable devices using the 800 MHz LTE system since they will be transmitting in the upper part of the 790 MHz to 862 MHz band, i.e. the part of the band which is closest to the frequencies used by Low Power Radio Devices.

== 868 MHz interference ==
Systems that use the 868 MHz-band (868–870 MHz), for example, thermostats, fire systems, burglar systems, and DIN-transceivers may have difficulty communicating when there is a strong 800 MHz broadband transmitter nearby.
