= Frédéric Bremer =

Frédéric Bremer (28 June 1892 – 7 April 1982) was a pioneer in the field of neurophysiology, whose work specialized in the neural mechanisms involved in the sleep-wake cycle. His other works include research into aphasia and apraxia, the neurogenic origin of diabetes insipidus, the physiology of the cerebellum, and the neural control of muscular tone.

== Early life ==
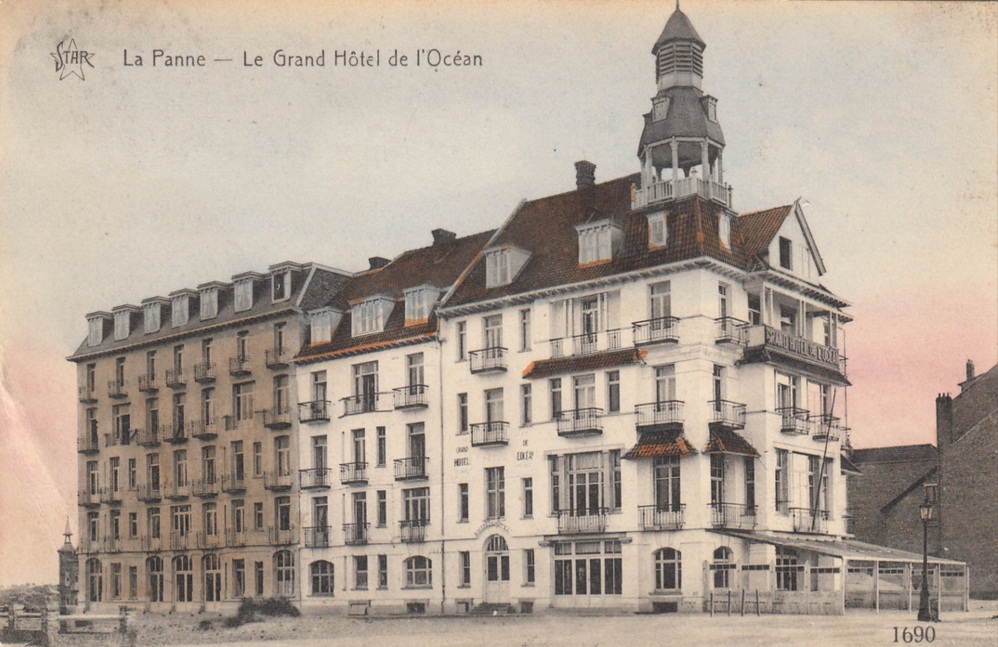
L'Océan (Océan Ambulance) Grand Hôtel Océan

Frédéric Bremer was born in Arlon, in the Belgian Ardennes in 1892. His parents were both well educated: his father and mother were teachers at the Arlon Public Secondary School. Frédéric Bremer himself was a bright student, who excelled in his medical studies at the University of Brussels. However, these studies were interrupted by the First World War, during which he served as military physician in a cavalry regiment, then later as a medical auxiliary at the famous Ocean Ambulance. This was a military hospital situated on the Belgian coast, in the city of La Panne, and was frequently attended by Queen Elisabeth of Belgium who worked there as a volunteer.

== Education ==
In 1919, he started his training in neurology, as the assistant of Professor Pierre Marie at the Hôpital de la Salpêtrière in Paris. Then, as a Fellow of the Belgian American Educational Foundation, he travelled to the US, and spent a year at Harvard University with H. Cushing, followed by visits to the physiology laboratories of Walter Bradford Cannon and Alex Forbes. Before finally returning to Belgium, he also spent some time in the famous laboratory of Sir Charles Scott Sherrington in Oxford. In 1924 Bremer became an Aggregate (Fellow) of the University of Brussels and in 1932 started teaching "General Pathology" at the Faculty of Medicine. Bremer, who was a popular teacher, became Professor in 1934.

=== First publication ===
His first publications in 1920 and 1921 were clinical descriptions of aphasia and apraxia. His first scientific research paper, which was published in collaboration with P. Bailey from Cushing's laboratory, dealt with the neurogenic origin of diabetes insipidus. Bremer, together with Bailey, showed that a minimal lesion of the hypothalamus can induce experimental diabetes insipidus. These lesions were also shown to induce sleepiness and adiposity. In addition, their data suggested the existence of a "thirst" centre in the hypothalamus. When Bremer returned to Belgium and embarked on a research career of his own, he turned his attention to the investigation of the physiology of the cerebellum, and the neural control of muscular tone. These studies eventually led him to sleep research.

== Sleep research ==
After some additional research in muscle tonus and the cerebellum, Bremer's curiosity pushed him towards the, what Bremer named, cerveau and encéphale isolé. Having observed the side effect of sleepiness after a lesion was produced on the hypothalamus, Bremer was curious as to what the effects of a lesion farther down would do. He decided to test his hypothesis by adapting a technique of decerebration in cats, that left the forebrain in situ after a mesencephalic transection, and applying it to the intercollicular section. While the transection was not a directly planned investigation of sleep, but the results influenced his future research career very heavily.

Bremer started his brain transection experiments at an opportune time. Neurophysiological techniques had greatly improved during the early 1930s with the introduction of Alex Forbes' electronic amplification. Electromagnetic oscillographs had replaced the Lippman electrometer and the string galvanometer in electrophysiological experiments. These newly introduced techniques allowed Lord Adrian and Matthews to confirm Hans Bergers revolutionary discovery of alpha electroencephalographic activity in humans.

With these advances in technology Bremer was able to start his transection experiments on cats, and accurately record the resulting brain function. His first procedure was to make a transection in the midbrain, the results were dramatic. The transection had deprived the brain of the ascending sensory impulses, except the olfaction and optical, and in so doing had caused a state identical to barbiturate sleep. This state was persistent as well as indefinite. This result lead Bremer to formulate the hypotheses that the immediate cause of sleep was a complete deprivation of sensory input from the impulses of the spine.

In order to further evaluate his deafferation "sleep hypothesis", Bremer conducted a second experiment in which he made a transection at a much lower level- just above where the brain stem and spinal cord meet. He termed this procedure the encéphale isolé, with this procedure he deprived the brain of all sensory input from the spine, but left all input from the cranial nerve intact. These results were very different from the midbrain transection. In contrast to the perpetual sleep state, the lower transection simply caused and alteration of sleep and wake cycle that was not different from a regular cat. This strengthened his belief in his hypothesis. Although unaware of the reticular activating system, discovered 14 years later by Giuseppe Moruzzi and Horace Magoun, Bremer attributed the sleep-wake cycle to the effects of sensory input to the brain. He concluded that sleep is simply a manifestation of a decrease in cortical "tone". The tone is maintained by the continuous flux of sensory information to the brain.

== Batini's disproving ==
Another research in the field of sleep, Batini, questioned Bremer's hypothesis and did an experiment similar to Bremers'. In 1939 Batini's experiment performed his experiment in which he stimulated of different areas of the reticular activating system, and his results concluded that sleep is not dependent on an influx or lack of stimulus from the body. Our bodies do not require input to have or maintain evidence of being awake.

== Summary ==
Although Bremer's hypothesis was ultimately proved flawed, he was still one of pioneers of neurophysiology. Through his work he inspired many to investigate more into the brain, which lead to the discovery of much of what we know now about the anatomy of the human brain and its functions. Bremer also followed up on his research in sleep and did research in things such as the biological clock. The effects of Bremer's insight will be felt throughout the history of neurophysiology.
