= Giuseppe Moruzzi =

Italian neurophysiologist

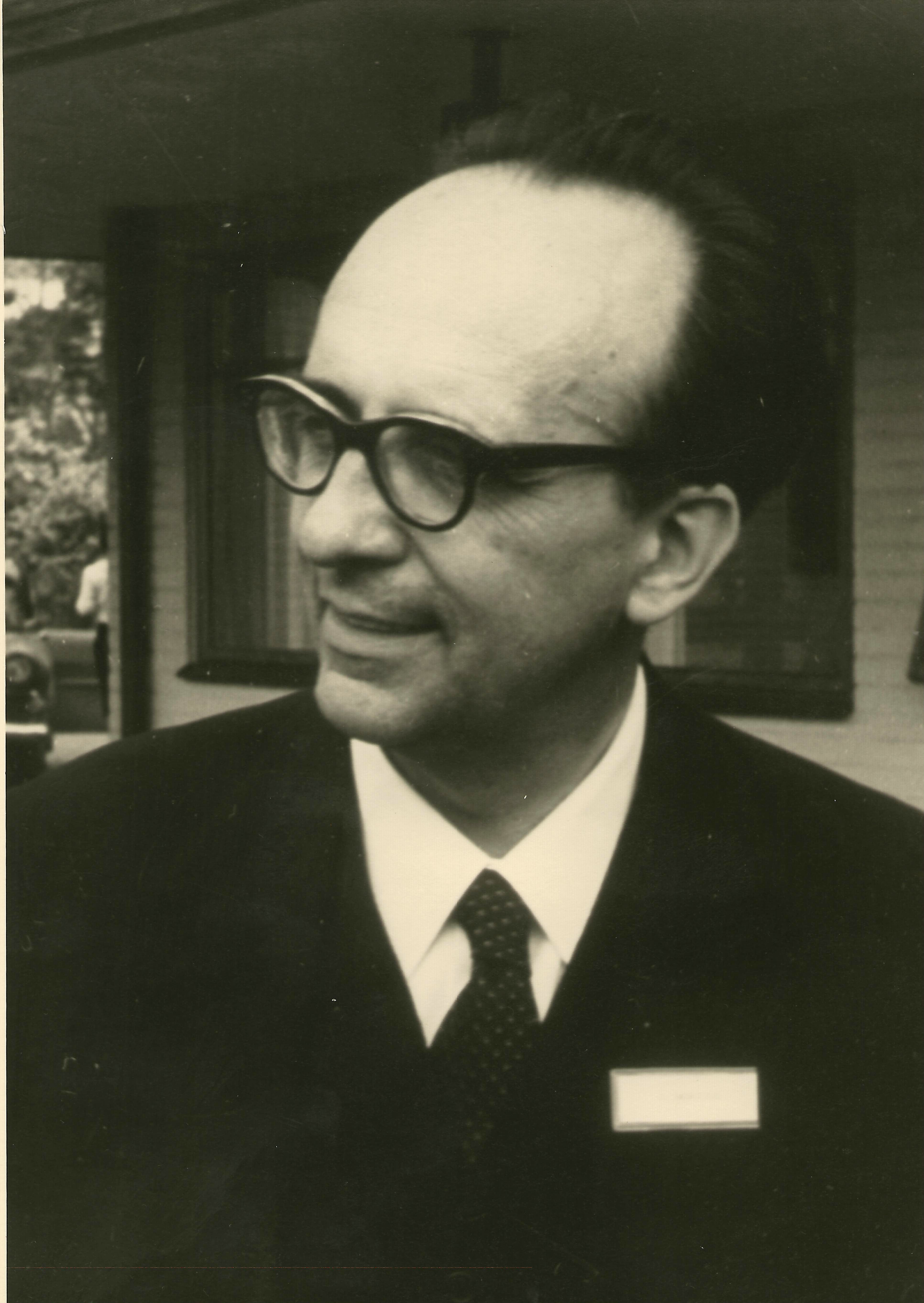
- Moruzzi in 1965
- Born: July 30, 1910; Campagnola Emilia, Italy
- Died: March 11, 1986 (aged 75); Pisa, Italy
- Known for: Discovery of the reticular activating system
- Awards: Karl Spencer Lashley Award (1965)
- Scientific career
- Fields: Neurophysiology
- Institutions: University of Pisa

Giuseppe Moruzzi (July 30, 1910 – March 11, 1986) was an Italian neurophysiologist. He was one of three scientists who connected wakefulness to a series of brain structures known as the reticular activating system, and his work reframed sleep as an active process in the brain rather than a passive one. He received the Karl Spencer Lashley Award from the American Philosophical Society and the Feltrinelli Prize from the Accademia dei Lincei.

== Early life ==
Born in Campagnola Emilia, Moruzzi grew up in Parma. He came from a line of physicians; his father was a general practitioner, his great-grandfather was a pathology professor, and his uncle was a colleague of Jean-Martin Charcot. History and literature were Moruzzi's favorite subjects when he was growing up, but he chose to study medicine because Italy's economy was struggling at the time and he knew that he would always have job opportunities with a medical degree.

Moruzzi studied at the University of Parma under neuroanatomist Antonio Pensa, who had been trained by Camillo Golgi. Pensa left to work in Pavia, but Moruzzi stayed behind, in part because he could not afford to move away from home but also because his interests had shifted from neuroanatomy to neurophysiology. Mario Camis mentored Moruzzi, and Moruzzi followed him to Bologna in 1936.

== Career ==
Beginning in 1937, Moruzzi studied under Frederic Bremer at the Neurophysiologic Institute at the University of Brussels. He then worked at the Neurophysiological Institute of Cambridge under Edgar Adrian, where the pair became known for recording discharges from single motor neurons in the pyramidal tracts. In the years following World War II, many European scientists relocated to the United States. Moruzzi came to Northwestern University to work with a brain scientist named Steven Ranson. Once at Northwestern, Moruzzi met Horace Winchell Magoun and Donald B. Lindsley, and they worked to elucidate the neural processes responsible for wakefulness.

Until the 1940s, some scientists felt like wakefulness simply required an adequate level of sensory input rather than a specific process inside the brain. In a 1949 experiment with a cat, Moruzzi and Magoun proved that stimulation of a certain brain region (near the intersection of the pons and midbrain) created a state of alertness. This stimulated area of the brain became known as the reticular activating system or reticular formation. In their experiments, Moruzzi and Magoun also transected the cat's reticular formation without disrupting any of the sensory nerves; the cat was rendered comatose. The experiment shifted science's conception of sleep from a passive process to one that was actively controlled by the brain.

== Death ==
Moruzzi was diagnosed with Parkinson's disease in 1975; he retired in 1980 and died in 1986. He was survived by his wife, Maria Vittoria Venturini, and two sons.

== Influence and legacy ==
The "Moruzzi school of physiology" helped to develop a generation of Italian scientists. Giovanni Berlucchi received early research training as a postdoctoral fellow with Moruzzi, and he became one of the most eminent Italian neurophysiologists. Moruzzi also influenced scientists like Giacomo Rizzolatti, Arnaldo Arduini, Lamberto Maffei and Piergiorgio Strata.

In 1965, Moruzzi won the Karl Spencer Lashley Award from the American Philosophical Society, of which he was a member. He was awarded the Feltrinelli Prize from the Accademia dei Lincei, and he received honorary degrees from several universities in the United States and Europe, including the University of Pennsylvania and the University of Lyon. In 1981, Moruzzi became a founding member of the World Cultural Council.

In a 1990 speech, Nobel laureate Rita Levi-Montalcini said that Moruzzi had been more deserving of the 1986 Nobel Prize that was awarded to her.
