= Waveform monitor =

Type of oscilloscope used in television production applications

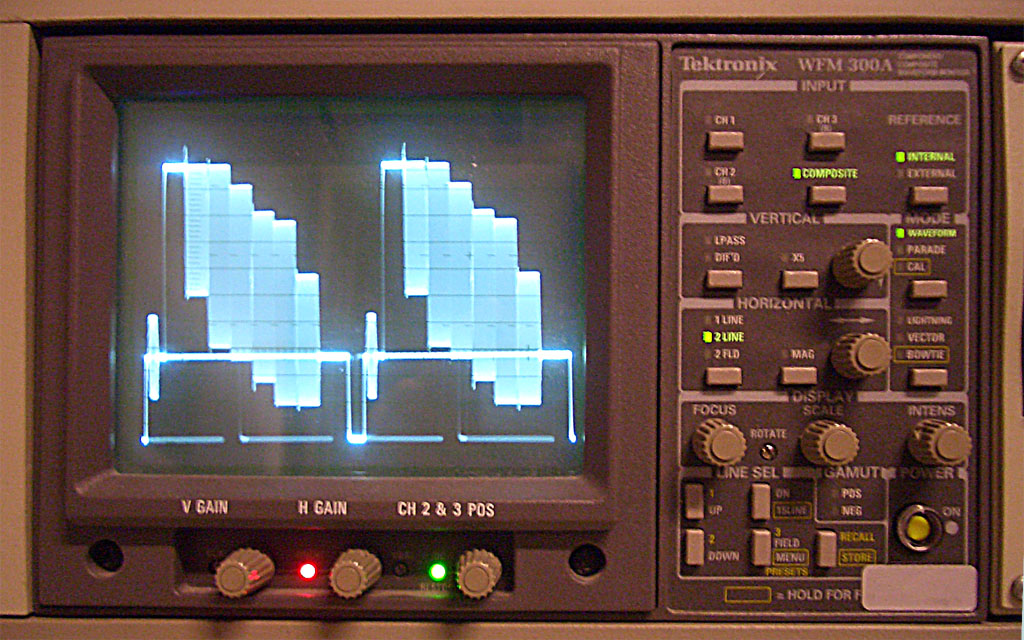
Waveform monitor in 2-line mode, showing color bars.

A waveform monitor is a special type of oscilloscope used in television production applications. It is typically used to measure and display the level, or voltage, of a video signal with respect to time.

The level of a video signal usually corresponds to the brightness, or luminance, of the part of the image being drawn onto a regular video screen at the same point in time. A waveform monitor can be used to display the overall brightness of a television picture, or it can zoom in to show one or two individual lines of the video signal. It can also be used to visualize and observe special signals in the vertical blanking interval of a video signal, as well as the color burst between each line of video.

Waveform monitors are used for the following purposes:

- To assist with the calibration of professional video cameras, and to "line up" multiple-camera setups being used at the same location in order to ensure that the same scene shot under the same conditions will produce the same results.
- To assist in telecine (film-to-tape transfer), color correction, and other video production activities
- To monitor video signals to make sure that neither the color gamut, nor the analog transmission limits, are violated.
- To diagnose and troubleshoot a television studio, or the equipment located therein.
- To assist with installation of equipment into a television facility, or with the commissioning or certification of a facility.
- To aid in manufacturing test and research and development applications.
- To aid in setting camera exposure in the case of video and digital cinema cameras.

A waveform monitor is often used in conjunction with a vectorscope. Originally, these were separate devices; however modern waveform monitors include vectorscope functionality as a separate mode. (The combined device is simply called a "waveform monitor").

Originally, waveform monitors were entirely analog devices; the incoming (analog) video signal was filtered and amplified, and the resulting voltage was used to drive the vertical axis of a cathode-ray tube. A sync stripper circuit was used to isolate the sync pulses and color burst from the video signal; the recovered sync information was fed to a sweep circuit which drove the horizontal axis. Early waveform monitors differed little from oscilloscopes, except for the specialized video trigger circuitry. Waveform monitors also permit the use of external reference; in this mode the sync and burst signals are taken from a separate input (thus allowing all devices in a facility to be genlocked, or synchronized to the same timing source).

With the advent of digital television and digital signal processing, the waveform monitor acquired many new features and capabilities. Modern waveform monitors contain many additional modes of operation, including picture mode (where the video picture is simply presented on the screen, much like a television), various modes optimized for color gamut checking, support for the audio portion of a television program (either embedded with the video, or on separate inputs), eye pattern and jitter displays for measuring the physical layer parameters of serial-digital television formats, modes for examining the serial digital protocol layer, and support for ancillary data and television-related metadata such as timecode, closed captions and the v-chip rating systems. Some digital cameras (such as the Nikon Z50II and Z9) allow for waveform monitoring while taking a video.

Modern waveform monitors and other oscilloscopes have largely abandoned old-style CRT technology as well. All new waveform monitors are based on a rasterizer, a piece of graphics hardware that duplicates the behavior of a CRT vector display, generating a raster signal. They may come with a flat-panel liquid crystal display, or they may be sold without a display, in which case the user can connect any VGA display.

== See also ==
- Color suite
- Non-linear editing system
- Linear video editing
- Control room
- Television studio production-control room
- Television production
