= Giovanni Berlucchi =

Italian physiologist, academic and author

- Born: 25 May 1935 (age 91); Pavia, Italy
- Occupations: Neuroscientist, academic and author
- Awards: Caruso Prize, Italian Society of Clinical Neurophysiology; Academia Europaea

Academic background
- Education: Doctor of Medicine; Postdoctoral Fellowship
- Alma mater: University of Pavia; California Institute of Technology

Academic work
- Institutions: University of Verona

Giovanni Berlucchi is an Italian physiologist, academic, and author. He is a professor Emeritus in the Department of Neurosciences, Biomedicine, and Movement Sciences at the University of Verona.

== Biography ==
Berlucchi was born in the Lombard city of Pavia on 25 May 1935, to Carlo Berlucchi, a clinical neurologist, and Elsa Baraldi.

After earning a degree in medicine from the University of Pavia in 1959, Berlucchi began his career at the University of Pisa under the neurophysiologist Giuseppe Moruzzi. From 1964 to 1965, he did postdoctoral work at the California Institute of Technology as a fellow of the U.S. National Health Institute and under Roger Wolcott Sperry, who introduced him to the corpus callosum and to the functions of the brain hemispheres. In 1968, he joined as a research associate the Department of Anatomy of the University of Pennsylvania. After becoming a full professor of physiology at the University of Siena in 1975, he occupied the same position at the University of Pisa from 1976 to 1983 and at the University of Verona from 1983 until retirement in 2010.

Following an initial involvement in the physiological study of the sleep-wake cycle, Berlucchi's research work has centered on the neural bases of cognition and behavior, with contributions to areas including the interactions and functional differences between the cerebral hemispheres, vision and visuospatial attention, and the representation of the body by the brain. He has also conducted research on the historical development of neuropsychology and particularly of the neuroscientific thinking about cerebral organization and its plasticity.

Berlucchi was the editor-in-chief of Neuropsychologia from 1993 to 1998. He was among the founders of the European Neuroscience Association and its journal, The European Journal of Neuroscience. He has co-authored the book Neurofobia with Salvatore Aglioti. He has contributed to handbooks including Handbook of Sensory Physiology, Handbook of Psychobiology, Handbook of Clinical and Experimental Neuropsychology, Handbook of Clinical Neurology.

Berlucchi is a national fellow of Accademia Nazionale dei Lincei and an elected member of Academia Europaea from 1990. He is a member of other scientific and cultural institutions, including the Accademia Nazionale Virgiliana, the Istituto Lombardo di Scienze Lettere ed Arti and the Istituto Veneto di Scienze Lettere ed Arti. His autobiography is published in The History of Neuroscience in Autobiography, a book series of the Society for Neuroscience.

== Awards and honors ==
- 1963 – Prize of the Società Italiana di Elettroencefalografia e Neurofisiologia clinica
- 1971 – Annual Lecture, European Brain and Behaviour Society
- 1972 – Elected Member, International Neuropsychology Symposium
- 1990 – Elected Member, Academia Europaea
- 1992 – Elected Member, Accademia dei Lincei
- 2001 – Caruso Prize of the Società italiana di Neurofisiologia clinica
- 2001 – Herlitzka Prize for Physiology, Accademia delle Scienze di Torino
- 2007 – Honorary degree in psychology, University of Pavia
- 2010 – Triennal Prize, Literary Society of Verona
- 2014 – Eranos-Jung Lecture, Monte Verità Ascona

== Bibliography ==
=== Books ===
- Handbook of Sensory Physiology (1973) ISBN 9783642654978
- Handbook of Psychobiology (1975) ISBN 9780122786563
- Encyclopaedia of Ignorance (1977) ISBN 9789995297701
- Structure and Functions of the Cerebral Commissures (1979) ISBN 9780839113911
- Handbook of Neuropsychology (2003) ISBN 9780444509550
- Handbook of Clinical and Experimental Neuropsychology (1999) ISBN 9780863775420
- Handbook of Clinical Neurology (2007) ISBN 978044464150
- Encyclopedia of Neuroscience (2009) ISBN 978-0-08-045046-9
- Neurofobia (2013) ISBN 9788860305855

=== Selected articles ===
- Berlucchi, G.; Gazzaniga, M. S.; Rizzolatti, G. (1967). "Microelectrode analysis of transfer of visual information by the corpus callosum". Archives Italiennes de Biologie. 105 (4): 583–596. PMID 5585725.
- Berlucchi, G.; Rizzolatti, G. (1968). "Binoculary driven neurons in visual cortex of split chiasm cats". Science. 159 (3812): 308–310. Bibcode:1968Sci...159..308B. doi:10.1126/science.159.3812.308. PMID 5634497.
- Rizzolatti, G.; Umiltà, C.; Berlucchi, G. (1971). "Opposite superiorities of the right and left cerebral hemispheres in discriminative reaction time to physiognomical and alphabetical material". Brain. 94 (3): 431–442. doi:10.1093/brain/94.3.431. PMID 5111713.
- Berlucchi, G.; Sprague, J. M. (1981). "The cerebral cortex in visual learning and memory, and in interhemispheric transfer in the cat". In Schmitt, F. O.; Worden, F. G.; Adelman, G.; Dennis, J. G. (eds.). The Organization of the Cerebral Cortex. Cambridge, Mass.: MIT Press. pp. 415–440.
- Berlucchi, G.; Antonini, A. (1990). "The role of the corpus callosum in the representation of the visual field in cortical areas". In Trevarthen, C. B. (ed.). Brain Circuits and Functions of the Mind. Cambridge: Cambridge University Press. pp. 129–139.
- Berlucchi, G.; Sperry, R. W. (1990). "Il cervello diviso". Sfera. 12: 66–69.
- Berlucchi, G.; Aglioti, S. (1997). "The body in the brain: Neural bases of corporeal awareness". Trends in Neurosciences. 20 (12): 560–564. doi:10.1016/S0166-2236(97)01136-3. PMID 9416668.
- Berlucchi, G. (2006). "Inhibition of return: A phenomenon in search of a mechanism and a better name". Cognitive Neuropsychology. 23 (7): 1065–1074. doi:10.1080/02643290600588426. PMID 21049368.
- Glickstein, M.; Berlucchi, G. (2008). "Classical disconnection studies of the corpus callosum". Cortex. 44 (8): 914–927. doi:10.1016/j.cortex.2008.04.001. PMID 18603234.
- Berlucchi, G.; Buchtel, H. A. (2009). "Neuronal plasticity: historical roots and evolution of meaning". Experimental Brain Research. 192 (3): 307–319. doi:10.1007/s00221-008-1611-6. PMID 19002678.
- Berlucchi, G.; Aglioti, S. M. (2010). "The body in the brain revisited". Experimental Brain Research. 200 (1): 25–35. doi:10.1007/s00221-009-1970-7. PMID 19690846.
- Corballis, M. C.; Corballis, P. M.; Berlucchi, G.; Marzi, C. A. (2018). "Perceptual unity in the split brain: the role of subcortical connections". Brain. 141 (6): e46–47. doi:10.1093/brain/awy088. PMC 5995197. PMID 29741648.
- Berlucchi, G.; Marzi, C. A. (2019). "Neuropsychology of Consciousness: Some History and a Few New Trends". Frontiers in Psychology. 10 50. doi:10.3389/fpsyg.2019.00050. PMC 6364520. PMID 30761035.
