= Differential gain =

Differential gain is a kind of linearity distortion that affects the amplification and transmission of analog signals. It can visibly affect color saturation in analog TV broadcasting.

== Composite color video signal ==
The composite color video signal (CCVS) consists of three terms:

- Luminance (monochrome) signal
- Auxiliary signals (sync pulse and blanking level signals )
- Chrominance, which is actually a subcarrier modulated by chroma information

The first two terms are usually called composite video signal (CVS)

The modulation technique of the color subcarrier is quadrature amplitude modulation (QUAM) both in PAL and NTSC systems. The amplitude of the color signal represents the saturation (purity) in both systems. On the other hand, the level of the CVS represents the brightness. So in order to reproduce the original vision in the receiver the ratio between these two pieces of information should be kept constant in the receiver.

== Nonlinearity in the broadcast system ==
The main steps of visual signal from the scene to receiver screen (for terrestrial broadcasting) are as follows:

- Cameras and associated buffer stages
- Recording circuits and storage medium (Compact disks, tapes etc.)
- Playback units and studio equipment
- Cable, microwave or TVRO equipment
- Transmitters (and sometimes also transposers)
- Receivers (and sometimes also antenna amplifiers and distribution units)

In cable broadcasting and satellite broadcasting some of the above maybe replaced by other equipment.

All of the above circuitry includes active circuit devices. These devices are only approximately linear devices. In particular, amplification factor is not constant for all levels. The amplification factor may decrease or increase as the input level increases. This is known as gain nonlinearity. In system specifications, the nonlinearity in percentage is almost always specified. It must be under a tolerable level depending on the required sensitivity of the system.

== Differential gain ==
Differential gain is a special case of gain nonlinearity. Let CCVS be represented by

$$\mbox{CCVS}=\mbox{CVS}+ \mbox {color}$$

The output of an ideal amplifier with the amplification factor of A is;

$$A\cdot (CVS+color) =A\cdot (CVS) + A\cdot (color)$$

However, in practice this goal is almost never attained. The amplification factor of color signal is always slightly different than that of CVS. (The color signal is superimposed on CVS).

== Problems caused by differential gain ==
Any color can be totally described by luminance, saturation and hue. When the gain of the reproduced color signal is lower than that of luminance, the perceived colors are paler than their originals. Conversely, when the gain of the reproduced color signal is higher than the luminance, the perceived colors are too loud.

== Measuring ==
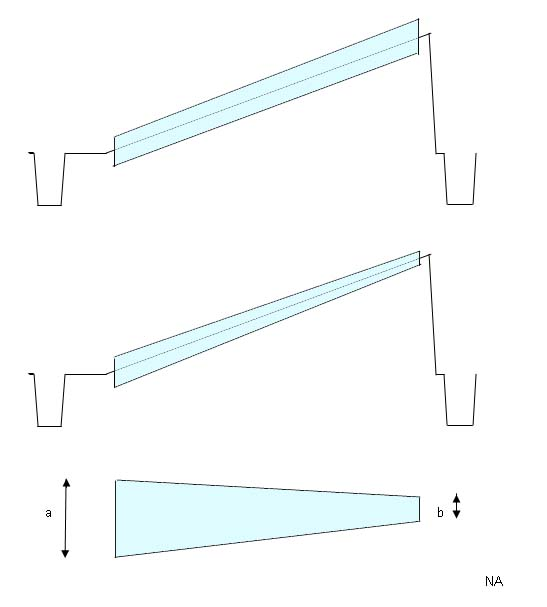
Top:Input, Middle:Output, Bottom:Output after HPF

To measure the percentage of differential gain, the standard sawtooth signal with superimposed color carrier is used (4.43 MHz in PAL and 3.58 MHz. in NTSC) The sawtooth represents the CVS with all possible levels between 0.3 V to 1 V. The waveforms are shown in the accompanying image frame. The top figure shows the input. Note that the amplitude of the superimposed color signal is constant. The middle figure shows the distorted output. In this example, color signal superimposed on a high level luminance signal has been attenuated. The bottom figure shows the same waveform after passing through a high pass filter to facilitate measuring. (CVS is filtered out leaving only color signal).

$$\mbox{DG} =\frac{a-b}{a}$$

According to European standards, DG should be less than 10%.

== A special case of PAL ==
DG is a problem both in NTSC and PAL. But PAL (phase alternation at line rate) is more sensitive to this kind of distortion. PAL averages phase differences of color signal in two consecutive lines.

Let $\alpha$ be the phase lag:

$$\mbox{f(t)} =\frac{1}{2}(\sin(\omega t+\alpha) +\sin(\omega t-\alpha))= \sin(\omega t)\cdot\cos(\alpha)$$

So the phase differences between two consecutive lines (so-called differential phase) are converted to differential gain distortions. (Hue is preserved at the risk of decreased saturation).

For example, a differential phase of 10° introduces an additional gain loss of 2%.
