= Differential phase =

Type of nonlinearity which causes distortion in color TV transmission

Differential phase is a kind of linearity distortion which affects the color hue in TV broadcasting.

== Composite color video signal ==
Composite color video signal (CCVS) consists of three terms:

- Monochrome (luminance) signal
- Auxiliary signals (sync pulse and blanking signals)
- Color signal, which is actually a subcarrier modulated by chroma information

The first two terms are usually called composite video signal (CVS)

The modulation technique of the color subcarrier is quadrature amplitude modulation (QAM) both in PAL and NTSC systems. The amplitude of the color signal represents the saturation of the color and the phase lag of the color signal with respect to a certain reference which is called color burst represents the hue; i.e., each phase lag is assigned to a different color hue. So, in order to reproduce the original color in the receiver, the phase difference between the color burst and the color signal must be kept constant throughout the broadcasting.

== The color burst ==
The color burst is a 10 period signal of color carrier (3.58 MHz in System M and 4.43 MHz in System B and System G). It is superimposed on the back porch of the CVS. The peak to peak amplitude is about 300 mV. That means that, when the color signal has a low luminance, its DC component is comparable to that of the color burst. All dark colors have more or less the same DC component as the color burst. But light colors have a higher luminance and hence a higher DC component.

== Differential phase distortion ==
During broadcasting, the inherent non linearity in electronic devices may cause a level dependent phase shift. Differential phase distortion (DP or dP) is the shift of color signal phase with respect to the color burst phase. When DC (brightness / luminance) levels of light colors and the color burst are different, the hue of the light colors may change. Especially a slight change in skin color may be irritating to viewers (too yellow or too red skin color depending on whether shift is positive or negative).

== PAL system ==
To solve the problem of differential phase distortion in PAL system, the polarity of both the color burst and the color signal are reversed in each consecutive lines. So in odd lines the phase of the color burst leads and in the even lines the phase of the color signal leads. However, if there is DP distortion in the system, the shift caused by DP has always the same polarity, thus the overall shift is more than the original in even line and less than the original in the odd line by the same amount. The average of two lines yields the original phase difference and thus the color.

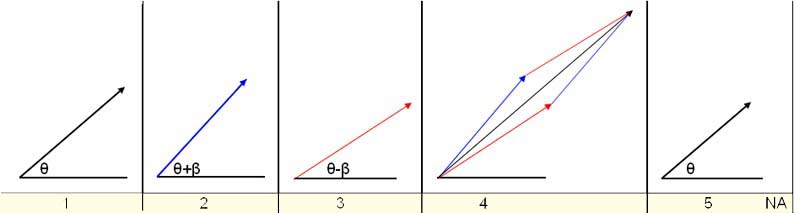
1. Original phase, 2. Phase in the first line, 3. Phase in the second line, 4. Vectorial addition, 5. Original phase reconstructed (with reduced amplitude)

The mathematics involved is as follows:

Let $\theta$ be the phase difference of the color signal with respect to the color burst and $\beta$ be the extra shift introduced by DP.

The original signal is

$\mbox{f(t)} =sin(\omega t+\theta)$

If there is a DP distortion, the received signal for the first line is

$\mbox{f(t)} =sin(\omega t+\theta+\beta)$

In the second line (after multiplying by -1)

$\mbox{f(t)} =sin(\omega t+\theta-\beta)$

The average is

$$\mbox{f(t)} =\frac{1}{2}(\sin(\omega t+\theta+\beta) +\sin(\omega t+\theta-\beta))= \sin(\omega t+\theta)\cdot\cos(\beta)$$

So while the effect of $\beta$ diminishes on the color hue, the amplitude of the color signal is reduced by $cos(\beta)$ which means that color saturation is reduced.

== See also ==
- Differential gain
