= Electromagnetic oscillograph =

Type of oscillograph

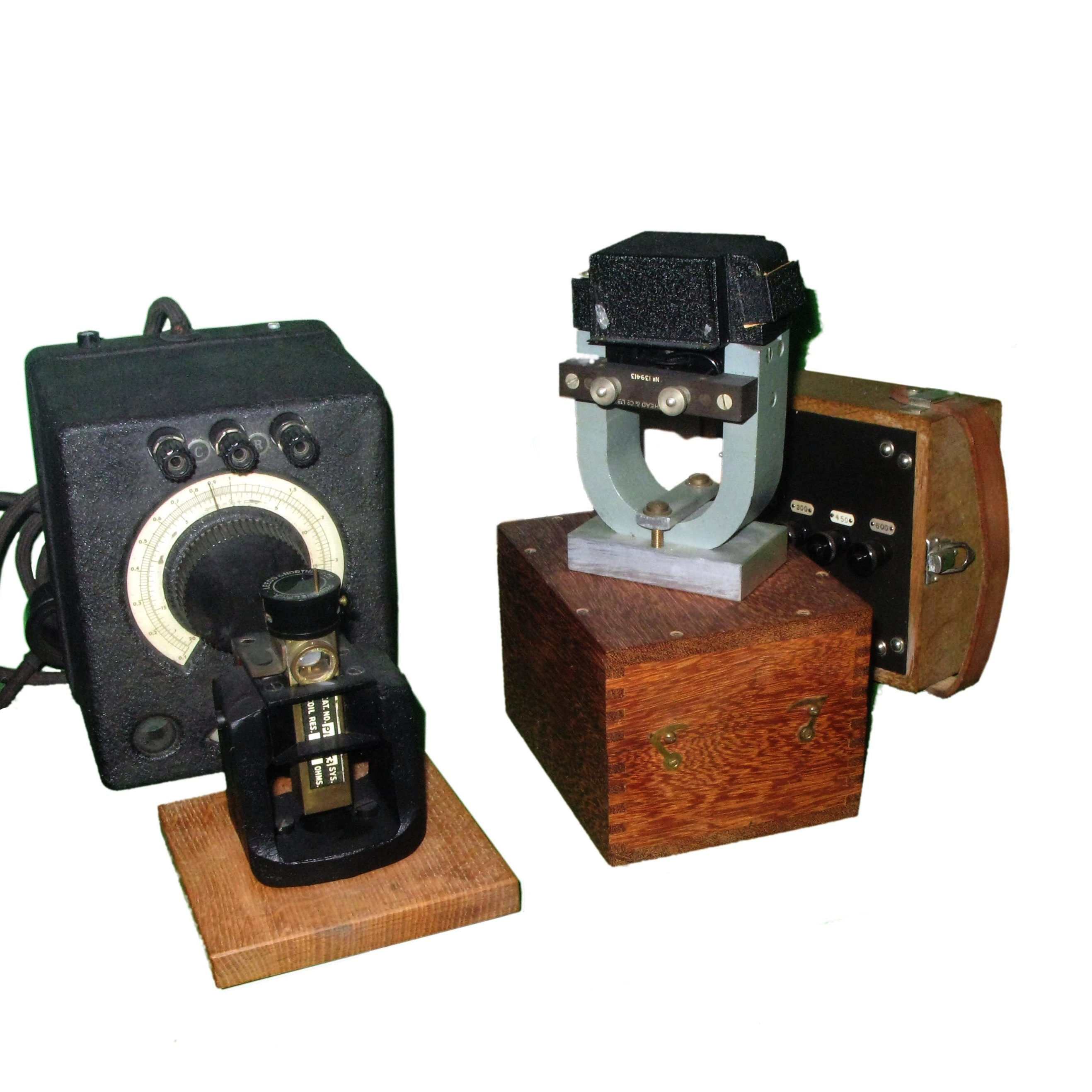

An electromagnetic oscillograph is an oscillograph which measures variations of electric current by having it go through a magnetic coil. Variations in current induce momentum in the coil, which can be directly measured.

The electromagnetic oscillograph was invented by William Duddell.

Some models utilise a mirror which reflects a beam of light, allowing measurement of minute movements of the coil. Other were fitted with a hand, possibly fitted with a pen to record values.
