= Antenna amplifier =

Amplifier applied on high frequency signals coming from an antenna

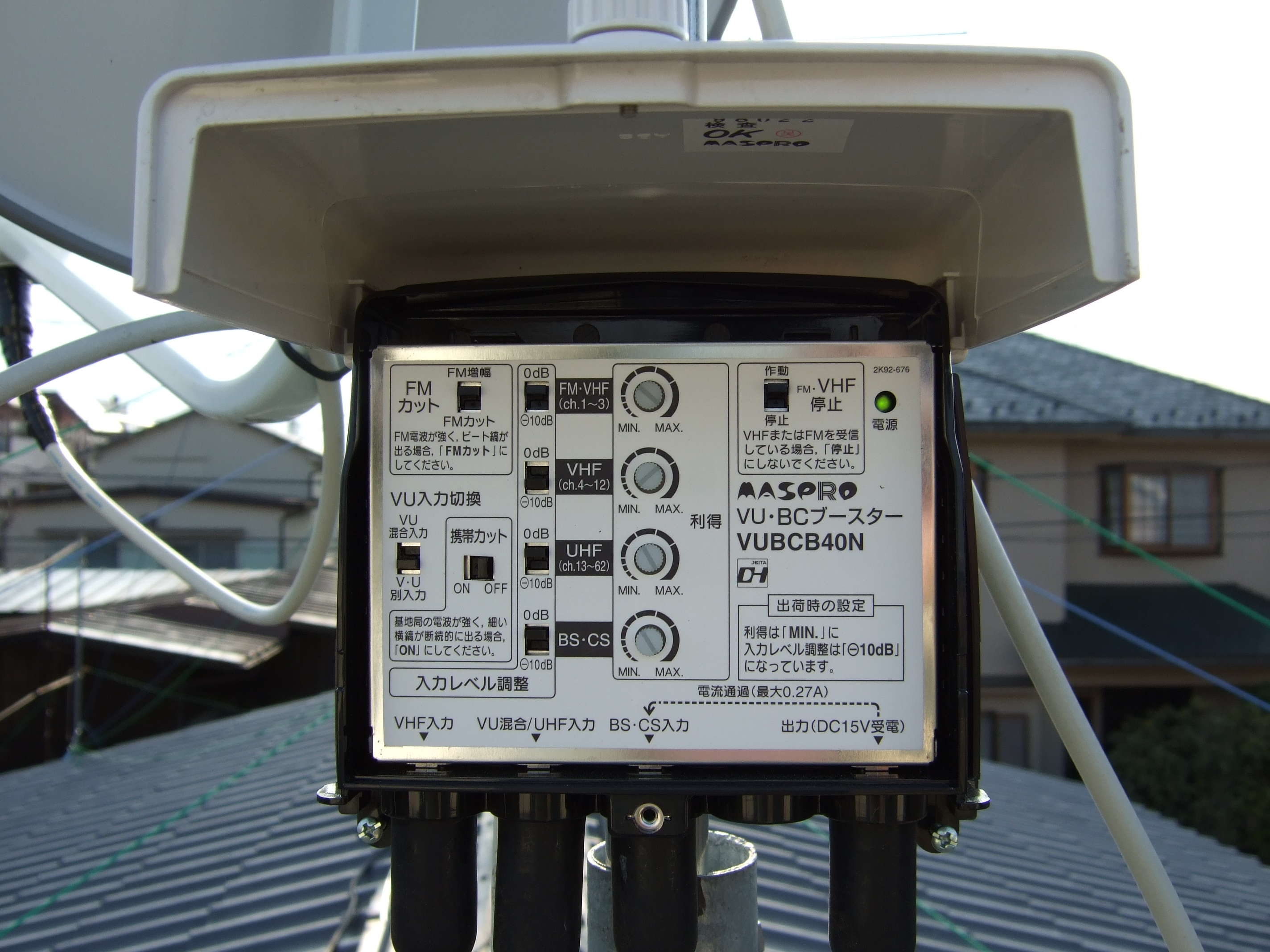
Antenna amplifier for broadcasting service (here: TV broadcasting and FM sound broadcasting).

In electronics, an antenna amplifier (also: aerial amplifier or booster) is a device that amplifies an antenna signal, usually into an output with the same impedance as the input impedance. Typically 75 ohm for coaxial cable and 300 ohm for twin-lead cable.

An antenna amplifier boosts a radio signal considerably for devices that receive radio waves. Many devices have an RF amplifier stage in their circuitry, that amplifies the antenna signal, these include, but are not limited to; radios, televisions, mobile phones and Wi-Fi and Bluetooth devices.

== See also ==
- Balun
- Cosmic microwave background radiation
