= List of ATSC standards =

The published ATSC standards for ATSC digital television service, issued by the Advanced Television Systems Committee:

- A/49: Ghost Canceling Reference Signal for NTSC (for adjacent-channel interference or co-channel interference with analog NTSC stations nearby)
- A/52B: audio data compression (Dolby AC-3 and E-AC-3)
- A/53E: "ATSC Digital Television Standard" (the primary document governing the standard)
- A/55: "Program Guide for Digital Television" (now deprecated in favor of A/65 PSIP)
- A/56: "System Information for Digital Television" (now deprecated in favor of A/65 PSIP)
- A/57A: "Content Identification and Labeling for ATSC Transport" (for assigning a unique digital number to each episode of each TV show, to assist DVRs)
- A/63: "Standard for Coding 25/50 Hz Video" (for use with PAL and SECAM-originated programming)
- A/64A "Transmission Measurement and Compliance for Digital Television"
- A/65C: "Program and System Information Protocol for Terrestrial Broadcast and Cable" (PSIP includes virtual channels, electronic program guides, and content ratings)
- A/68: "PSIP Standard for Taiwan" (defines use of Chinese characters via Unicode 3.0)
- A/69: recommended practices for implementing PSIP at a TV station
- A/70A: "Conditional Access System for Terrestrial Broadcast"
- A/71: "ATSC Parameterized Services Standard"
- A/72: "Video System Characteristics of AVC in the ATSC Digital Television System" (implementing H.264/MPEG-4 as well as MVC for 3D television)
- A/76: "Programming Metadata Communication Protocol" (XML-based PMCP maintains PSIP metadata though a TV station's airchain)
- A/79: "Conversion of ATSC Signals for Distribution to NTSC Viewers" (recommended practice, issued February 2009)
- A/80: "Modulation and Coding Requirements for Digital TV (DTV) Applications Over Satellite" (ATSC-S)
- A/81: "Direct-to-Home Satellite Broadcast Standard" (not yet implemented by any services)
- A/82: "Automatic Transmitter Power Control (ATPC) Data Return Link (DRL) Standard"
- A/85: "Techniques for Establishing and Maintaining Audio Loudness for Digital Television"
- A/90: "Data Broadcast Standard" (for datacasting)
- A/92: "Delivery of IP Multicast Sessions over Data Broadcast Standard" (for IP multicasting)
- A/93: "Synchronized/Asynchronous Trigger Standard"
- A/94: "ATSC Data Application Reference Model"
- A/95: "Transport Stream File System Standard" (TSFS is a special file system for downloading computer files)
- A/96: "ATSC Interaction Channel Protocols" (interactive TV)
- A/97: "Software Data Download Service" (used by UpdateTV for upgrades and software patches in ATSC tuners)
- A/98: "System Renewability Message Transport"
- A/99: "Carriage Of Legacy TV Data Services" (for former analog supplemental services that used the vertical blanking interval lines, such as closed captioning and teletext)
- A/100: "DTV Application Software Environment - Level 1" (DASE-1)
- A/101: "Advanced Common Application Platform" (ACAP)
- A/103:2014: "Non-Real-Time Delivery"
- A/104: "ATSC 3D-TV Terrestrial Broadcasting"
- A/105:2015: "Interactive Services Standard"
- A/106:2015: "ATSC Security and Service Protection Standard"
- A/107:2015: "ATSC 2.0 Standard"
- A/110A: "Synchronization Standard for Distributed Transmission" (single-frequency networks)
- A/112: E-VSB (Enhanced Vestigal Sideband)
- A/153: ATSC-M/H

In 2004, the main ATSC standard was amended to support Enhanced ATSC (A/112); this transmission mode is backwardly compatible with the original 8-Bit Vestigal Sideband modulation scheme, but provides much better error correction.

ATSC-M/H for mobile TV has been approved and added to some stations, though it uses MPEG-4 instead of MPEG-2 for encoding, and behaves as an MPEG-4-encoded subchannel, inheriting 8VSB from the remainder of the channel.

== ATSC 3.0 ==
ATSC 3.0 is a non-backwards-compatible version of ATSC that uses OFDM instead of 8VSB and a much newer video codec (instead of ATSC 1 and 2's MPEG-2).

On March 28, 2016, the Bootstrap component of ATSC 3.0 (System Discovery and Signalling) was upgraded from candidate standard to finalized standard.

On May 4, 2016, the Audio Codec component of ATSC 3.0 was elevated to candidate standard, with two finalists remaining: Dolby AC-4 and MPEG-H Audio Alliance format from Fraunhofer IIS, Qualcomm and Technicolor SA. A third entry from DTS named DTS:X (a successor to DTS-HD) was withdrawn before the standard was upgraded to candidate status.

On September 8, 2016, the Physical Layer Download (OFDM) component of ATSC 3.0 was upgraded from candidate standard to finalized standard.

On October 5, 2016, the Link Layer Protocol Standard (A/330) was elevated from Candidate to final standard, along with the Audio Watermark Emission Standard (A/334) and Video Watermark Emission Standard (A/335). ATSC Technology Group 3 (TG3) members have also begun voting on elevating the following Candidate Standards to Proposed Standard status (the final step before becoming an approved standard): Service Announcement (A/322), Service Usage Reporting (A/333) and Captions and Subtitles (A/343). TG3 members also are voting to elevate Security (A/360) to Candidate Standard status, joining Schedule and Studio-to-Transmitter Link Standard (A/324), which was recently elevated. On March 30, 2016, A/324 (Schedule and Studio-to-Transmitter Link) was upgraded from Proposed to Candidate Standard.

On January 3, 2017, ATSC announced the updated status of its standards, in time for its debut at the Consumer Electronics Show in Las Vegas. As a result, this update, Captions and Subtitles (A/343) was upgraded from Candidate to Finalized Standard; Security (A-360), Lab Performance Test Plan (A-325) and Field Test Plan (A-326) were upgraded to Candidate Standard from "Under Consideration".

By March 7, 2017, ATSC announced a further update to the status of its standards, with the following as Finalized: A/321 (System Discovery and Signaling); A/322 Physical Layer Protocol (COFDM); A/326 (Field Test Plan [Recommended Practice]); A/330 (Link Layer Protocol); A/333 (Service Usage Reporting); A/334 (Audio Watermark Emission); A/335 (Video Watermark Emission); A/336 (Content Recovery in Redistribution Scenarios [ATSC 3.0 over Cable and Satellite]); A/342 Part 1 (Audio Common Elements); A/342 Part 2 (Audio: Dolby AC-4 System); A/342 Part 3 (Audio MPEG-H System); and A/343 (Captions and Subtitles). The following are Proposed Standards: A/325 (Lab Performance Test Plan [Recommended Practice]); A/332 (Service Announcement); A/338 (Companion Device); A/341 (Video - H.265/HEVC). The following are Candidate Standards: A/300 (ATSC 3.0 System); A/324 (Scheduler/Studio-to-Transmitter Link); A/331 (Signalling, Delivery, Sync Error Protection); A/337 (Application Signalling); A/344 (Interactive Content); A/360 (Security and Service Protection). The following is a Draft Standard: A/323 (Physical Layer Uplink/Downlink).

Structure/ATSC 3.0 System Layers

1. Bootstrap: System Discovery and Signalling
2. Physical Layer: Transmission (OFDM)
3. Link Layer Protocols: IP, MMT
4. Presentation: Audio and Video standards (to be determined), Ultra HD with High Definition and standard-definition multicast, Immersive Audio
5. Applications: Screen is a web page

Finalized Standards

- A/200: Regional Service Availability (finalized on July 8, 2020)
- A/300: ATSC 3.0
- A/321: System Discovery and Signalling
- A/322: Physical Layer Download
- A/323: Dedicated Return Channel for ATSC 3.0 (Physical Layer Upload/Download (Uplink/Downlink)) (accepted on 2 November 2017, finalized on December 7, 2018)
- A/324: Schedule and Studio-to-Transmitter Link (finalized on 5 January 2018)
- A/325: Recommended Practice: TG3/S32 Lab Performance Test Plan
- A/326: Field Test Plan (Recommended Practice)
- A/330: Link Layer Protocol
- A/331: Signaling, Delivery, Synchronization, and Error Protection (finalized on 6 December 2017)
- A/332: Service Announcement
- A/333: Service Usage Reporting
- A/334: Audio Watermark Emission
- A/335: Video Watermark Emission
- A/336: Content Recovery in Redistribution Scenarios
- A/337: Application Signaling (finalized on January 2, 2018)
- A/338: Companion Device
- A/339:2017, “ATSC Recommended Practice: Audio Watermark Modification and Erasure”
- A/341: Video Standard (H.265, Scalable HEVC with HDR)
- A/341:2018, “Video – HEVC, With Amendments No. 1 and No. 2″ (Approved January 24, 2018. Amendment No. 1 approved March 9, 2018. Amendment No. 2 approved March 12, 2018, finalized on February 14, 2019)
- A/342: Audio Standard (composed of the following three parts)
- A/341 Amendment – 2094-40 (HEVC Video Codec, Finalized on September 19, 2021)
- A/342 Part 1: Audio Common Elements
- A/342 Part 2: AC-4 System
- A/342 Part 3: MPEG-H AA System (declared the audio standard for ATSC 3.0 in South Korea)
- A/343: Captions and Subtitles
- A/344: Application Runtime Environment Standard (apps for advanced televisions) (finalized December 18, 2017)
- A/360: Security and Service Protection (encryption for broadcasters) (finalized January 9, 2018)

Proposed Standards

Candidate Standards

- A/331:2021: Signaling, Delivery, Synchronization, and Error Protection (Most Recent Document, approved on December 9, 2021
- A/344:2021: Interactive Content (Most Recent Document, approved November 24, 2021)
- A/345: Personalization

Draft Standards

Under Consideration - Working Drafts and Recommended Practices

- A/327: Guidelines for the Physical Layer Protocol (Most Recent Document Approved January 25, 2021)
- A/350: Guide to the Link-Layer Protocol (Most Recent Document Approved: July 19, 2019)
- A/351: Techniques for Signaling, Delivery and Synchronization (Most Recent Document Approved: February 15, 2021)
- A/361: Security and Content Protection (Most Recent Document Approved: December 10, 2019)
- A/362: Digital Rights Management (DRM) (Most Recent Document Approved: January 17, 2020)
- A/370: Conversion of ATSC 3.0 Services for Redistribution (Most Recent Document Approved: December 11, 2019)
- A/380: Haptics for ATSC 3.0 (Most Recent Document Approved: February 3, 2021)
