= ALC =

ALC may refer to:

== Businesses and organizations ==
=== Schools ===
- Alice Lloyd College, Pippa Pases, Kentucky, U.S.
- Andhra Loyola College, Andhra Pradesh, India; a Jesuit higher education college
- Australian Lutheran College, North Adelaide, Australia; a divinity college and seminary

=== Sports and games ===
- Atlantic Lottery Corporation, Atlantic Canada
- American Lacrosse Conference, a women's collegiate lacrosse league division
- Atlantic Lacrosse Conference, a U.S. men's collegiate lacrosse league division

=== Military ===
- Air logistics center, in the U.S. Air Force
- Army Legal Corps, of the British Army

=== Other businesses and organizations ===
- A.L.C (Andrea Lieberman Company), a U.S. fashion company
- ALC Publishing, a U.S. manga dojin comics publisher
- Action with Lao Children, a Laotian educational non-profit N.G.O.
- American Legend Cooperative, a North American mink fur marketing cooperative
- American Lutheran Church (1930) (1930–1960)
- American Lutheran Church (1960–1987)
- Anindilyakwa Land Council, Groote Archipelago, Australia
- Area Learning Center, Milaca, Minnesota, U.S.
- Asian Law Caucus, U.S. AAPI civil rights and legal aid organization

== Computing and electronics ==
- Asynchronous Layered Coding
- Attributive Concept Language with Complements, a description logic
- ALC201A, ALC202, etc.; Avance Logic AC'97 audio chipsets
- Audio Lossless Coding
- Automatic level control - used in RF power amplifiers to protect them

== Transport ==
- ALC (automobile), a 1911 British cyclecar model
- Air Lease Corporation, a U.S. aircraft lessor
- Australian Logistics Council, a transport industry association
- Landing Craft Assault, a British W.W.II boat type
- Jaguar Advanced Lightweight Coupe Concept, a 2005 concept car model
- Alicante Airport (IATA: ALC), Valencia, Spain
- Alliance station (Amtrak: ALC), Stark, Ohio, U.S.

== Other uses ==
- Acetylcarnitine, a biochemical
- Ethyl alcohol, an organic compound ("alc." on beverage labelling)
- Kawésqar language (ISO 639-3: alc), spoken in Chile

== See also ==
- ALCS (disambiguation)
