= Education in Laos (post-1990) =

The Lao government identified the need to equip citizens with the necessary skills and knowledge in the modern working environment. This has resulted in an improvement in the adult literacy rate (age 15 and above). Based on the 2005 census, the literacy rate was recorded at 72.7%.

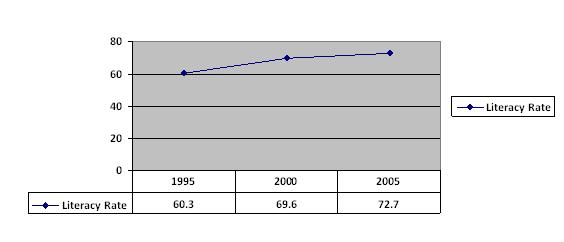

== Education in Laos ==
Documentation of events before 1990.

== Structure of education system ==
The academic year is 33 weeks across all levels and is conducted in two semesters each consisting of 16–17 weeks.

The table below breaks down the ages of the students in the pre-primary, primary and secondary levels in the Laos education system.

=== Pre-school ===
There are kindergartens that cater to children from 3 to 5 years old. However, attendance in pre-school is not compulsory. Hence there is a low enrollment rate of below 10% for both males and females.

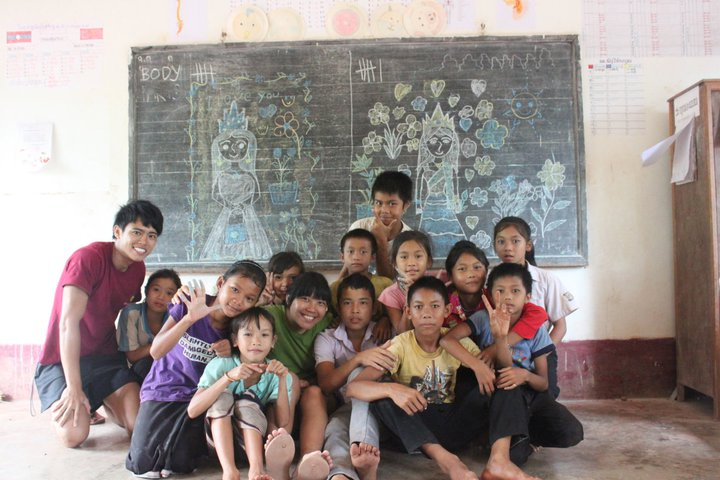
A typical classroom setting in Laos

=== Primary school ===
There are 8,968 primary schools in Laos. Primary school starts at the age of 6 and lasts for five years. This phase of education was made compulsory in 2003. The new law did not boost enrollment rate. It has stagnated since year 2000 with slight increase for female enrollment. Lao language, mathematics and physical education are some of the lessons conducted in a primary school. Students are given quizzes, tests and exams periodically and achieve a certificate after sitting for primary leaving examination.

=== Secondary school ===
There are an estimated 1,000 formal secondary schools established in Laos. The transition rate from primary to secondary is estimated to be 77.6%.

Secondary school is branched into lower-secondary and upper-secondary. Before 2009, lower- and upper-secondary each lasted three years. It is now four years of lower secondary and three years of upper-secondary. Upper secondary is open to students who pass the lower secondary examinations. Thereafter, it is further divided into general, technical, vocational and primary school. Secondary education is legally free-of-charge, though the schools charge a registration fee.

=== Higher education ===
Higher education can be attained from National University of Laos (NUOL), private institutions and teacher training colleges. Qualifications on offer include diploma, Bachelor's degree, Master's degree and Doctoral.

==== National University of Laos ====
In 1975, the Sisavangvong University was dissolved following the departure of many teaching staff. Upper secondary graduates had to seek higher education in Eastern Europe and the USSR. In 1996, UNOL was set up to provide higher education for Laotian. It now comprises 11 faculties: Architecture, Engineering, Economics and Business Management, Environment, Law and Political Science, Agriculture, Education, Forestry, Letters, Sciences and Social Science. In 2006, they had 26,673 students.

== Problems in Laos' education system ==
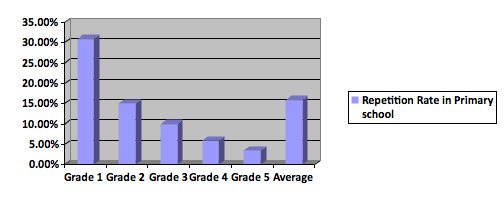

Accessibility to education in Laos is low, and this is a major problem. Only 50% of the primary schools offer full education up to Grade 5. Most of the students are poor and are deterred from attending school by the costly daily transport (due to the lack of boarding facilities) as well as the opportunity cost of not working. Furthermore, up to 30% of primary school teachers are unqualified to teach. This hinders school progression and takes up to 10 years to produce a primary school graduate (refer to graph). Gender inequality sets in through the years. It is almost non-existent in pre-school but reaches to more than 10% by lower secondary.

== Non-governmental organization ==
For non-governmental organizations committed to Lao's Education Development, refer to Action with Lao Children.
