= Sixth grade =

Educational year group

Sixth grade (also 6th grade or grade 6) is the sixth year of formal or compulsory education. Students in sixth grade are usually 11–12 years old, although in some countries, students are aged 12–13 in sixth grade. It is commonly the first grade of middle school or junior secondary school and the seventh school year since kindergarten.

== Afghanistan ==
In Afghanistan, Grade 6 is the first year of middle school. Students are aged 11–13. Also known as year 6.

== Australia ==
In Australia, this level of class is called Year 6. Students generally start this level between the ages of eleven and twelve. Grade 6 is generally the last grade for primary schools in Australia.

== Brazil ==
In Brazil, grade 6 (6º Ano or 6ª Série) is the first year of middle school. It is the sexto ano do Ensino Fundamental II.

== Canada ==
In Canada, the equivalent is Grade 6.

== France ==
In France, the equivalent of sixth grade is Sixième and is the first year of Collège (middle school). Students are 11–12 years old.

== Germany ==
In Germany, where the different federal states have different educational systems, Grade 6 (6. Klasse) is the final year of primary school or the second year of secondary school. Therefore, the sixth grade in Germany is not highschool.

== Israel ==
In Israel, Grade 6 (called Kita Vav) is the final year of elementary school (except for the cities Lod, Givatayim and Ramat Gan).

== Indonesia ==
In Indonesia, Grade 6 (Indonesian Kelas 6) is the final year of elementary school (sekolah dasar) before being promoted to middle school (sekolah menengah pertama SMP) students here aged 11–12.

== Italy ==
In Italy, Grade 6 is the first year of secondary or middle school (called "Scuola secondaria di primo grado"). Students are 11–12 years old.

== Kenya ==
In Kenya, the sixth grade is the 6th and last year of primary school in the CBC system. In the 844 system, there are 8 years in primary school. Students are usually 10–11 in this grade.

== Kuwait ==
In Kuwait, Grade 6 can be the first year of middle school, but it can also be the final year of elementary school (depending on the education system in place).

== Laos ==
In Laos, Grade 6 is the first year of middle school.

== Malaysia ==
In Malaysia, the equivalent is Year 6 also known as Standard 6, as the Malaysia academic year starts in January. Before 2021, students will sit for an important exam called Ujian Penilaian Sekolah Rendah (UPSR), which translates from Malay into English as "Low/Elementary School Assessment Test", before graduating from elementary education. Now students take the newly implemented exam, called Ujian Akhir Sesi Akademik (UASA), or "End of Academic Session Exam", which runs until Form 3. Standard 6 is the final primary/elementary school year before embarking into secondary /high school (Form 1). In Malaysia, primary education is commonly broken down into primary school and secondary school.

== Mexico ==
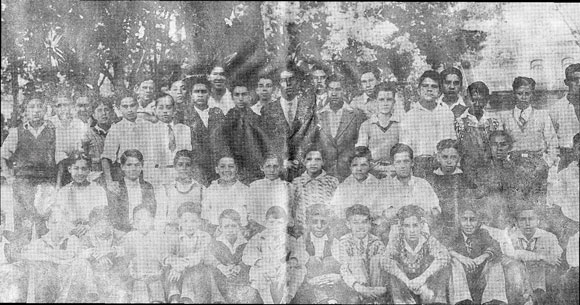
Luis Echeverría, then-future president of Mexico, seen amidst his sixth grade class

In Mexico, “Primaria” education, in its current form, became compulsory in 2009, and runs from grade one through grade six, for students aged 6–12 years. The Secretariat of Public Education (SEP) officially determines primary school as a part of ‘Basic Education’, making it free, with one year of mandatory pre-school education. SEP standardizes curriculum content for public and private schools, which includes Spanish, Mathematics, Natural Sciences, History, Geography, Art, and Physical Education. The National Institute for Assessment of Education monitors standards and provides quality control. Middle Education

== Peru ==
In Peru, grade 6 is the final year of primary school.

== Philippines ==
In the Philippines, Grade 6 (Filipino: Baitang Anim) is the final year of Intermediate Level and Elementary School curriculum.

The 1945–2017 or K–10 educational system was entirely phased out upon implementing K–12 curriculum on Grade 6 on June 5, 2017 which completed the 9-year process of implementing K–12 (alongside the adding of Grade 12 into the pre-university cycle) and phaseout of the older K–10 that were started on May 20, 2008 and April 24, 2012, respectively.

Students usually in females can also start at the young age of 10.

== Portugal ==
In Portugal, grade 6 (6º ano de escolaridade) is the second year of middle school.

== Poland ==
In Poland, grade 6 (klasa szósta) is the sixth year of primary/elementary school. Until 2017, it was the last year of primary/elementary school, and at the end, students took the sprawdzian szóstoklasisty, which translates into "sixth grader's exam".

== Saudi Arabia ==
In Saudi Arabia, Grade 6 is the last year of elementary school.

== Singapore ==
In Singapore, the equivalent is Year 6 also known as Primary 6. They would have to take the Primary School Leaving Examination at around September to proceed to Secondary School.

During this time, students in Primary 6 would learn Algebra and 3D Shapes, age from 12 to 13 years old.

== South Korea ==
In South Korea, Grade 6 is the final year of elementary school.

== Sweden ==
In Sweden, Grade 6 is the final year of middle school (mellanstadiet). Students are often 12–13 years old unless they've been promoted or held back. The following grade (Grade 7) is then the start of high school (högstadiet). Students get grades for the first time in Grade 6; once at the end of the first term/winter term (Terminsbetyg) and one at the end of the grade (Sexans betyg).

Students also get to do their second national tests, called "Nationella prov" in Sweden. These tests are done at the end of Grade 3, Grade 6 and finally Grade 9. In Grade 6, the students take part in two different parts of the tests: first oral tests during the first term and then written tests in the second. The oral test is test A, then the written tests are done on separate days and are divided into Test B, C, D and E.

These tests are done in the subjects Swedish/Swedish as a secondary language, Math and English. In Grade 3 students only do one oral test in Swedish and written tests in Swedish and Math and in Grade 9 students do oral tests in the subjects Swedish, Math and English and written tests in Swedish, Math, English, Social Studies (SO) and Science (NO). Some schools also do written tests in modern languages (German, French, Spanish).

== Vietnam ==
In Vietnam, Grade 6 is the first year of middle school.

== United States ==
The sixth grade is the sixth school year after kindergarten. Students are usually 11–12 years old.

It is most commonly the first year of middle school, although it can be the last year of elementary school in some school districts.

Less commonly, it can also be the last year of intermediate school or the second year of middle school.

In mathematics, many students are taught the basic concepts of pre-algebra, such as the concept of integers, constants, variables, exponents, roots, scientific notation, and formulas. Students may learn basic statistics such as mean, median, mode, and range.

== Uruguay ==
In Uruguay, the sixth grade is the sixth and final year of primary school. Students are usually 11–12 years old.

== See also ==
- Year Six
- Educational stage
- Student

Preceded by Fifth grade	Sixth grade age 11–12	Succeeded by Seventh grade
