= ATSC standards =

Standards for digital television in the US

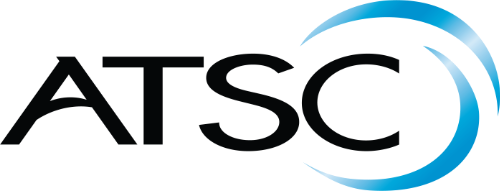
ATSC standards logo

Map of countries by standard of digital terrestrial television used. Countries that use ATSC are shown in orange.

Advanced Television Systems Committee (ATSC) standards are an international set of standards for broadcast and digital television transmission over terrestrial, cable and satellite networks. It is largely a replacement for the analog NTSC standard. Like NTSC, ATSC is used mostly in the United States, Mexico, Canada, South Korea, and Trinidad and Tobago. Several former NTSC users like Japan have not used ATSC during their digital television transition, because they adopted other systems like ISDB developed by Japan and DVB developed in Europe, for example.

The ATSC standards were developed in the early 1990s by the Grand Alliance, a consortium of electronics and telecommunications companies that assembled to develop a specification for what is known as HDTV. In 1996 to 1999, a "model station", WHD-TV, located in Washington, D.C., was used to develop and test the new standard. The resulting standard is administered by the Advanced Television Systems Committee. It includes a number of patented elements, and licensing is required for devices that use these parts of the standard. Key among these is the 8VSB modulation system used for over-the-air broadcasts. ATSC 1.0 technology was primarily developed with patent contributions from LG Electronics, which held most of the patents for the ATSC standard.

ATSC includes two primary high definition video formats, 1080i and 720p. It also includes standard-definition formats, although initially only HDTV services were launched in the digital format. ATSC can carry multiple channels of information on a single stream, and it is common for there to be a single high-definition signal and several standard-definition signals carried on a single 6 MHz (former NTSC) channel allocation.

== Background ==
The high-definition television standards defined by the ATSC produce widescreen 16:9 images up to 1920×1080 pixels in size – more than six times the display resolution of the earlier standard. However, many different image sizes are also supported. The reduced bandwidth requirements of lower-resolution images allow up to six standard-definition "subchannels" to be broadcast on a single 6 MHz TV channel.

ATSC standards are marked A/x (x is the standard number) and can be downloaded for free from the ATSC's website at ATSC.org. ATSC Standard A/53, which implemented the system developed by the Grand Alliance, was published in 1995; the standard was adopted by the Federal Communications Commission in the United States in 1996. It was revised in 2009. ATSC Standard A/72 was approved in 2008 and introduces H.264/AVC video coding to the ATSC system.

ATSC supports 5.1-channel surround sound using Dolby Digital's AC-3 format. Numerous auxiliary datacasting services can also be provided.

Many aspects of ATSC were patented, including elements of the MPEG video coding, the AC-3 audio coding, and the 8VSB modulation. The cost of patent licensing, estimated at up to $50 per digital TV receiver, had prompted complaints by manufacturers.

As with other systems, ATSC depends on numerous interwoven standards, e.g., the EIA-708 standard for digital closed captioning, leading to variations in implementation.

== Digital switchover ==
ATSC replaced much of the analog NTSC television system in the United States on June 12, 2009, on August 31, 2011, in Canada, on December 31, 2012, in South Korea, and on December 31, 2015, in Mexico.

Broadcasters who used ATSC and wanted to retain an analog signal were temporarily forced to broadcast on two separate channels, as the ATSC system requires the use of an entire separate channel. Channel numbers in ATSC do not correspond to RF frequency ranges, as they did with analog television. Instead, virtual channels, sent as part of the metadata along with the program(s), allow channel numbers to be remapped from their physical RF channel to any other number 1 to 99, so that ATSC stations can either be associated with the related NTSC channel numbers, or all stations on a network can use the same number. There is also a standard for distributed transmission systems (DTx), a form of single-frequency network which allows for the synchronised operation of multiple on-channel booster stations.

== Audio ==
Dolby Digital AC-3 is used as the audio codec, though it was standardized as A/52 by the ATSC. It allows the transport of up to five channels of sound with a sixth channel for low-frequency effects (the so-called "5.1" configuration). In contrast, Japanese ISDB HDTV broadcasts use MPEG's Advanced Audio Coding (AAC) as the audio codec, which also allows 5.1 audio output. DVB (see below) allows both.

MPEG-2 audio was a contender for the ATSC standard during the DTV "Grand Alliance" shootout, but lost out to Dolby AC-3. The Grand Alliance issued a statement finding the MPEG-2 system to be "essentially equivalent" to Dolby, but only after the Dolby selection had been made. Later, a story emerged that MIT had entered into an agreement with Dolby whereupon the university would be awarded a large sum of money if the MPEG-2 system was rejected. Dolby also offered an incentive for Zenith to switch their vote (which they did); however, it is unknown whether they accepted the offer.

== Video ==
The ATSC system supports a number of different display resolutions, aspect ratios, and frame rates. The formats are listed here by resolution, form of scanning (progressive or interlaced), and number of frames (or fields) per second (see also the TV resolution overview at the end of this article).

For transport, ATSC uses the MPEG systems specification, known as an MPEG transport stream, to encapsulate data, subject to certain constraints. ATSC uses 188-byte MPEG transport stream packets to carry data. Before decoding of audio and video takes place, the receiver must demodulate and apply error correction to the signal. Then, the transport stream may be demultiplexed into its constituent streams.

=== MPEG-2 ===
There are four basic display sizes for ATSC, generally known by referring to the number of lines of the picture height. NTSC and PAL image sizes are smallest, with a width of 720 (or 704) and a height of 480 or 576 lines. The third size is HDTV images that have 720 scan lines in height and are 1280 pixels wide. The largest size has 1080 lines high and 1920 pixels wide. 1080-line video is actually encoded with 1920×1088 pixel frames, but the last eight lines are discarded prior to display. This is due to a restriction of the MPEG-2 video format, which requires the height of the picture in luma samples (i.e. pixels) to be divisible by 16.

The lower resolutions can operate either in progressive scan or interlaced mode, but not the largest picture sizes. The 1080-line system does not support progressive images at the highest frame rates of 50, 59.94 or 60 frames per second, because such technology was seen as too advanced at the time. The standard also requires 720-line video be progressive scan, since that provides better picture quality than interlaced scan at a given frame rate, and there was no legacy use of interlaced scan for that format. The result is that the combination of maximum frame rate and picture size results in approximately the same number of samples per second for both the 1080-line interlaced format and the 720-line format, as 1920*1080*30 is roughly equal to 1280*720*60. A similar equality relationship applies for 576 lines at 25 frame per second versus 480 lines at 30 frames per second.

A terrestrial (over-the-air) transmission carries 19.39 megabits of data per second (a fluctuating bandwidth of about 18.3 Mbit/s left after overhead such as error correction, program guide, closed captioning, etc.), compared to a maximum possible MPEG-2 bitrate of 10.08 Mbit/s (7 Mbit/s typical) allowed in the DVD standard and 48 Mbit/s (36 Mbit/s typical) allowed in the Blu-ray disc standard.

Although the ATSC A/53 standard limits MPEG-2 transmission to the formats listed below (with integer frame rates paired with 1000/1001-rate versions), the U.S. Federal Communications Commission declined to mandate that television stations obey this part of the ATSC's standard. In theory, television stations in the U.S. are free to choose any resolution, aspect ratio, and frame/field rate, within the limits of Main Profile @ High Level. Many stations do go outside the bounds of the ATSC specification by using other resolutions – for example, 352 x 480 or 720 x 480.

"EDTV" displays can reproduce progressive scan content and frequently have a 16:9 widescreen format, allowing 60 progressive frames per second in NTSC or 50 in PAL.

ATSC Standard A/53 Part 4:2009 (MPEG-2 Video System Characteristics)
Resolution		Aspect ratio	Pixel aspect ratio	Scanning	Frame rate (Hz)
Vertical	Horizontal	Aspect ratio	Pixel aspect ratio	Scanning	Frame rate (Hz)
1080	1920	16:9	1:1	progressive	23.976; 24; 29.97; 30
1080	1920	16:9	1:1	interlaced	29.97 (59.94 fields/s); 30 (60 fields/s)
720	1280	16:9	1:1	progressive	23.976; 24; 29.97; 30; 59.94; 60
480	704	4:3 or 16:9	10:11 or 40:33	progressive	23.976; 24; 29.97; 30; 59.94; 60
480	704	4:3 or 16:9	10:11 or 40:33	interlaced	29.97 (59.94 fields/s); 30 (60 fields/s)
480	640	4:3	1:1	progressive	23.976; 24; 29.97; 30; 59.94; 60
480	640	4:3	1:1	interlaced	29.97 frames/s (59.94 fields/s); 30 frames/s (60 fields/s)

ATSC also supports PAL frame rates and resolutions which are defined in ATSC A/63 standard.

ATSC Standard A/63:1997 (Standard for Coding 25/50 Hz Video)
Resolution		Aspect ratio	Pixel aspect ratio	Scanning	Frame rate (Hz)
Vertical	Horizontal	Aspect ratio	Pixel aspect ratio	Scanning	Frame rate (Hz)
1080	1920	16:9	1:1	interlaced	25 (50 fields/s)
1080	1920	16:9	1:1	progressive	25
720	1280	16:9	1:1	progressive	50
576	720	4:3 or 16:9	SMPTE 259M	progressive	25; 50
576	720	4:3 or 16:9	SMPTE 259M	interlaced	25 (50 fields/s)
576	544	4:3 or 16:9	SMPTE 259M three quarters	progressive	25
576	544	4:3 or 16:9	SMPTE 259M three quarters	interlaced	25 (50 fields/s)
576	480	4:3 or 16:9	SMPTE 259M two thirds	progressive	25
576	480	4:3 or 16:9	SMPTE 259M two thirds	interlaced	25 (50 fields/s)
576	352	4:3 or 16:9	SMPTE 259M half	progressive	25
576	352	4:3 or 16:9	SMPTE 259M half	interlaced	25 (50 fields/s)
288	352	4:3 or 16:9	CIF	progressive	25

The ATSC A/53 specification imposes certain constraints on MPEG-2 video stream:

- The maximum bit rate value in the sequence header of the MPEG-2 video stream is 19.4 Mbit/s for broadcast television, and 38.8 Mbit/s for the "high data rate" mode (e.g., cable television). The actual MPEG-2 video bit rate will be lower, since the MPEG-2 video stream must fit inside a transport stream.
- The amount of MPEG-2 stream buffer required at the decoder (the vbv_buffer_size_value) must be less than or equal to 999,424 bytes.
- In most cases, the transmitter can't start sending a coded image until within a half-second of when it's to be decoded (vbv_delay less than or equal to 45000 90-kHz clock increments).
- The stream must include colorimetry information (gamma curve, the precise RGB colors used, and the relationship between RGB and the coded YCbCr).
- The video must be 4:2:0 (chrominance resolution must be 1/2 of luma horizontal resolution and 1/2 of luma vertical resolution).

The ATSC specification and MPEG-2 allow the use of progressive frames coded within an interlaced video sequence. For example, NBC stations transmit a 1080i60 video sequence, meaning the formal output of the MPEG-2 decoding process is sixty 540-line fields per second. However, for prime-time television shows, those 60 fields can be coded using 24 progressive frames as a base – actually, an 1080p24 video stream (a sequence of 24 progressive frames per second) is transmitted, and MPEG-2 metadata instructs the decoder to interlace these fields and perform 3:2 pulldown before display, as in soft telecine.

The ATSC specification also allows 1080p30 and 1080p24 MPEG-2 sequences, however they are not used in practice, because broadcasters want to be able to switch between 60 Hz interlaced (news), 30 Hz progressive or PsF (soap operas), and 24 Hz progressive (prime-time) content without ending the 1080i60 MPEG-2 sequence.

The 1080-line formats are encoded with 1920 × 1088 pixel luma matrices and 960 × 540 chroma matrices, but the last 8 lines are discarded by the MPEG-2 decoding and display process.

=== H.264/MPEG-4 AVC ===
In July 2008, ATSC was updated to support the ITU-T H.264 video codec. This standard is split in two parts:

- A/72 part 1: Video System Characteristics of AVC in the ATSC Digital Television System
- A/72 part 2 : AVC Video Transport Subsystem Characteristics

The standards support 1080p at 50, 59.94 and 60 frames per second; such frame rates require H.264/AVC High Profile Level 4.2, while standard HDTV frame rates only require Levels 3.2 and 4, and SDTV frame rates require Levels 3 and 3.1.

ATSC Standard A/72 Part 1:2008 (Video System Characteristics of AVC)
Resolution		Aspect ratio	Pixel aspect ratio	Scanning	Frame rate (Hz)	Level
Vertical	Horizontal	Aspect ratio	Pixel aspect ratio	Scanning	Frame rate (Hz)	Level
1080	1920	16:9	1:1	progressive	23.976; 24; 29.97; 30; 25	4
1080	1920	16:9	1:1	progressive	59.94; 60; 50	4.2
1080	1920	16:9	1:1	interlaced	29.97 (59.94 fields/s); 30 (60 fields/s); 25 (50 fields/s)	4
1080	1440	16:9	HDV (4:3)	progressive	23.976; 24; 29.97; 30; 25	4
1080	1440	16:9	HDV (4:3)	progressive	59.94; 60; 50	4.2
1080	1440	16:9	HDV (4:3)	interlaced	29.97 (59.94 fields/s); 30 (60 fields/s); 25 (50 fields/s)	4
720	1280	16:9	1:1	progressive	23.976; 24; 29.97; 30; 59.94; 60; 25; 50	3.2, 4
480	720	4:3 or 16:9	SMPTE 259M (10:11 or 40:33)	progressive	23.976; 24; 29.97; 30; 59.94; 60; 25; 50	3.1, 4
480	720	4:3 or 16:9	SMPTE 259M (10:11 or 40:33)	interlaced	29.97 (59.94 fields/s); 30 (60 fields/s); 25 (50 fields/s)	3
480	704	4:3 or 16:9	SMPTE 259M (10:11 or 40:33)	progressive	23.976; 24; 29.97; 30; 59.94; 60; 25; 50	3.1, 4
480	704	4:3 or 16:9	SMPTE 259M (10:11 or 40:33)	interlaced	29.97 (59.94 fields/s); 30 (60 fields/s); 25 (50 fields/s)	3
480	640	4:3	1:1	progressive	23.976; 24; 29.97; 30; 59.94; 60; 25; 50	3.1, 4
480	640	4:3	1:1	interlaced	29.97 (59.94 fields/s); 30 (60 fields/s); 25 (50 fields/s)	3
480	544	4:3	SMPTE 259M three quarters (40:33)	progressive	23.976; 25	3
480	544	4:3	SMPTE 259M three quarters (40:33)	interlaced	29.97 (59.94 fields/s); 25 (50 fields/s)	3
480	528	4:3	SMPTE 259M three quarters (40:33)	progressive	23.976; 25	3
480	528	4:3	SMPTE 259M three quarters (40:33)	interlaced	29.97 (59.94 fields/s); 25 (50 fields/s)	3
480	352	4:3	SMPTE 259M half (20:11)	progressive	23.976; 25	3
480	352	4:3	SMPTE 259M half (20:11)	interlaced	29.97 (59.94 fields/s); 25 (50 fields/s)	3
240	352	4:3	SIF (10:11)	progressive	23.976; 25	3
120	176	4:3	SIF half (10:11)	progressive	23.976; 25	1.1

== Transport stream (TS) ==
The file extension ".TS" stands for "transport stream", which is a media container format. It may contain a number of streams of audio or video content multiplexed within the transport stream. Transport streams are designed with synchronization and recovery in mind for potentially lossy distribution (such as over-the-air ATSC broadcast) in order to continue a media stream with minimal interruption in the face of data loss in transmission. When an over-the-air ATSC signal is captured to a file via hardware/software the resulting file is often in a .TS file format.

== Modulation and transmission ==
ATSC signals are designed to use the same 6 MHz bandwidth as analog NTSC television channels (the interference requirements of A/53 DTV standards with adjacent NTSC or other DTV channels are very strict). Once the digital video and audio signals have been compressed and multiplexed, the transport stream can be modulated in different ways depending on the method of transmission.

- Terrestrial (local) broadcasters use 8VSB modulation that can transfer at a maximum rate of 19.39 Mbit/s, sufficient to carry several video and audio programs and metadata.
- Cable television stations can generally operate at a higher signal-to-noise ratio and can use either the 16VSB as defined in ATSC or the 256-QAM defined in SCTE, to achieve a throughput of 38.78 Mbit/s, using the same 6 MHz channel.

The proposals for modulation schemes for digital television were developed when cable operators carried standard-resolution video as uncompressed analog signals. In recent years, cable operators have become accustomed to compressing standard-resolution video for digital cable systems, making it harder to find duplicate 6 MHz channels for local broadcasters on uncompressed "basic" cable.

Currently, the Federal Communications Commission requires cable operators in the United States to carry the analog or digital transmission of a terrestrial broadcaster (but not both), when so requested by the broadcaster (the "must-carry rule"). The Canadian Radio-television and Telecommunications Commission in Canada does not have similar rules in force with respect to carrying ATSC signals.

However, cable operators have still been slow to add ATSC channels to their lineups for legal, regulatory, and plant & equipment related reasons. One key technical and regulatory issue is the modulation scheme used on the cable: cable operators in the U.S. (and to a lesser extent Canada) can determine their own method of modulation for their plants. Multiple standards bodies exist in the industry: the SCTE defined 256-QAM as a modulation scheme for cable in a cable industry standard, ANSI/SCTE 07 2006: Digital Transmission Standard For Cable Television. Consequently, most U.S. and Canadian cable operators seeking additional capacity on the cable system have moved to 256-QAM from the 64-QAM modulation used in their plant, in preference to the 16VSB standard originally proposed by ATSC. Over time 256-QAM is expected to be included in the ATSC standard.

There is also a standard for transmitting ATSC via satellite; however, this is only used by TV networks. Very few teleports outside the U.S. support the ATSC satellite transmission standard, but teleport support for the standard is improving. The ATSC satellite transmission system is not used for direct-broadcast satellite systems; in the U.S. and Canada these have long used either DVB-S (in standard or modified form) or a proprietary system such as DSS or DigiCipher 2.

== Other systems ==

ATSC coexists with the DVB-T standard, and with ISDB-T. A similar standard called ADTB-T was developed for use as part of China's new DMB-T/H dual standard. While China has officially chosen a dual standard, there is no requirement that a receiver work with both standards and there is no support for the ADTB modulation from broadcasters or equipment and receiver manufacturers.

For compatibility with material from various regions and sources, ATSC supports the 480i video format used in the NTSC analog system (480 lines, approximately 60 fields or 30 frames per second), 576i formats used in most PAL regions (576 lines, 50 fields or 25 frames per second), and 24 frames-per-second formats used in film.

While the ATSC system has been criticized as being complicated and expensive to implement and use, both broadcasting and receiving equipment are now comparable in cost with that of DVB.

The ATSC signal is more susceptible to changes in radio propagation conditions than DVB-T and ISDB-T. It also lacks true hierarchical modulation, which would allow the SDTV part of an HDTV signal (or the audio portion of a television program) to be received uninterrupted even in fringe areas where signal strength is low. For this reason, an additional modulation mode, enhanced-VSB (E-VSB) has been introduced, allowing for a similar benefit.

In spite of ATSC's fixed transmission mode, it is still a robust signal under various conditions. 8VSB was chosen over COFDM in part because many areas are rural and have a much lower population density, thereby requiring larger transmitters and resulting in large fringe areas. In these areas, 8VSB was shown to perform better than other systems.

COFDM is used in both DVB-T and ISDB-T, and for 1seg, as well as DVB-H and HD Radio in the United States. In metropolitan areas, where population density is highest, COFDM is said to be better at handling multipath propagation. While ATSC is also incapable of true single-frequency network (SFN) operation, the distributed transmission mode, using multiple synchronized on-channel transmitters, has been shown to improve reception under similar conditions. Thus, it may not require more spectrum allocation than DVB-T using SFNs. A comparison study found that ISDB-T and DVB-T performed similarly, and that both were outperformed by DVB-T2.

== Mobile TV ==
Mobile reception of digital stations using ATSC has, until 2008, been difficult to impossible, especially when moving at vehicular speeds. To overcome this, there are several proposed systems that report improved mobile reception: Samsung/Rhode & Schwarz's A-VSB, Harris/LG's MPH, and a recent proposal from Thomson/Micronas; all of these systems have been submitted as candidates for a new ATSC standard, ATSC-M/H. After one year of standardization, the solution merged between Samsung's AVSB and LGE's MPH technology has been adopted and would have been deployed in 2009. This is in addition to other standards like the now-defunct MediaFLO, and worldwide open standards such as DVB-H and T-DMB. Like DVB-H and ISDB 1seg, the proposed ATSC mobile standards are backward compatible with existing tuners, despite being added to the standard well after the original standard was in wide use.

Mobile reception of some stations will still be more difficult, because 18 UHF channels in the U.S. have been removed from TV service, forcing some broadcasters to stay on VHF. This band requires larger antennas for reception, and is more prone to electromagnetic interference from engines and rapidly changing multipath conditions.

== Future ==
=== ATSC 2.0 ===
ATSC 2.0 was a planned major new revision of the standard which would have been backward compatible with ATSC 1.0. The standard was to have allowed interactive and hybrid television technologies by connecting the TV with the Internet services and allowing interactive elements into the broadcast stream. Other features were to have included advanced video compression, audience measurement, targeted advertising, enhanced programming guides, video on demand services, and the ability to store information on new receivers, including Non-realtime (NRT) content.

However, ATSC 2.0 was never actually launched, as it was essentially outdated before it could be launched. All of the changes that were a part of the ATSC 2.0 revision were adopted into ATSC 3.0.

=== ATSC 3.0 ===
ATSC 3.0 will provide even more services to the viewer and increased bandwidth efficiency and compression performance, which requires breaking backward compatibility with the current version. On November 17, 2017, the FCC voted 3–2 in favor of authorizing voluntary deployments of ATSC 3.0, and issued a Report and Order to that effect. ATSC 3.0 broadcasts and receivers are expected to emerge within the next decade.

LG Electronics tested the standard with 4K on February 23, 2016. With the test considered a success, South Korea announced that ATSC 3.0 broadcasts would start in February 2017.

On March 28, 2016, the Bootstrap component of ATSC 3.0 (System Discovery and Signalling) was upgraded from candidate standard to finalized standard.

On June 29, 2016, NBC affiliate WRAL-TV in Raleigh, North Carolina, a station known for its pioneering roles in testing the original DTV standards, launched an experimental ATSC 3.0 channel carrying the station's programming in 1080p, as well as a 4K demo loop.

Structure/ATSC 3.0 system layers

1. Bootstrap: System Discovery and Signalling
2. Physical Layer: Transmission (OFDM)
3. Protocols: IP, MMT
4. Presentation: Audio and Video standards (to be determined), Ultra HD with High Definition and standard-definition multicast, Immersive Audio
5. Applications: Screen is a web page

==== ATSC 3.0 advantages ====
1. Better image quality. ATSC 3.0 allows UHD transmission, including high-dynamic-range television (HDR-TV), wide color gamut (WCG), and high frame rate (HFR).
2. Reception upgrades. ATSC 3.0 allows the same aerial to receive more channels with better quality.
3. Portable devices such as mobile phones, tablets, and car infotainment systems can receive TV signals.
4. Enhanced emergency alerts. Emergency signals can be geographically oriented and inform only the specific areas where they are required.
5. Audience measure. Telecommunication companies can easily take audience data gatherings.
6. Targeted advertising with the assistance of local network Wi-Fi.
7. Content variety and diversification.

==== ATSC 3.0 disadvantages ====
1. Digital rights management encryption being used on ATSC 3.0 stations, preventing many DVRs from being able to access them and limiting the functionality of the remaining that can access them.
2. Usage of the Dolby AC-4 audio codec, which has very limited support and is unsupported by many media players.

== Countries and territories using ATSC ==
The following countries use the ATSC broadcast standard: neighbouring countries may also pick up ATSC signals due to signal overspill.

=== North America ===
- Bermuda March 9, 2016, before initially announcing DVB-T (on 10 July 2007)
- Antigua and Barbuda 2018
- Bahamas On December 14, 2011, the Bahamas' national public broadcaster ZNS-TV announced that it would adopt ATSC, in line with the United States and its territories.
- Barbados opened in digital television on December 4, 2024.
- Canada adopted ATSC, with full-power analog stations in specified "mandatory markets" (which included provincial capitals, and cities with a population of 300,000 or higher) shutting down on August 31, 2011. The CBC only converted its originating stations to digital; it was given permission to operate its repeaters in mandatory markets (such as CBKST in Saskatoon) for an additional year, but later announced that it would shut down all of its analog repeaters on July 31, 2012, citing budget issues and their distribution network as being obsolete.
- Dominica 1996
- Dominican Republic The Dominican Republic announced its adoption on August 10, 2010, completing the transition on September 24, 2015, but most companies were not able to meet the deadline and the government had to move it forward to the year 2021.
- Grenada 1996
- Haiti 1996
- Jamaica Will convert to ATSC 3.0 instead of 1.0. The conversion will begin in 2016 and is expected to be completed by 2022 and is expected to be completed by 2023.
- Mexico began converting to ATSC in 2013; a full transition was scheduled for December 31, 2015, but due to technical and economic issues for some transmitters, the full transition was extended to December 31, 2016.
- Saint Lucia opened on Saint Lucia on ATSC on March 5, 2024.
- Trinidad and Tobago will convert to ATSC 3.0 instead of ATSC 1.0. The conversion process will begin in March 2023 and is expected to be completed by 2026.
- United States Full-power television stations in the United States ended analog television service on June 12, 2009. Analog low-power stations and translators were all wound down by July 13, 2021.
- Guyana As of August 2025, the Guyana Learning Channel is broadcasting a multiplex in the ATSC standard. On March 19, 2025, it launched a campaign for the delivery of digital receivers to households which only receive analog signals. In early 2025, the National Communications Network began digital terrestrial broadcasts of its channels, NCN HD and NCN Sports in 1080p using the ATSC standard. CTV19 also officially launched its digital feed on August 4, 2025.
- Suriname Suriname has undergone transitioning from analogue NTSC broadcasts to digital ATSC broadcasts. Channel ATV started with ATSC broadcasts in the Paramaribo area in June 2014, which was followed by ATSC broadcasts from stations in Brokopondo, Wageningen and Albina. The stations in Brokopondo, Wageningen and Albina broadcast both the channels of ATV (i.e., ATV and TV2) and STVS. In 2016, all channels in Suriname had already made the switch to ATSC.

=== South America ===
- Brazil has adopted ATSC 3.0 for its upcoming "DTV+" platform, transitioning from ISDB-T International. Test broadcasts began on June 11, 2026 for the 2026 FIFA World Cup and are expected to officially launch in 2027.

=== Asia/Pacific ===
- South Korea South Korea completed its transition to ATSC on December 31, 2012, although it still operates some analog signals along its northern border for reception in North Korea.
- United States territories in the Pacific, including American Samoa, Guam, and the Northern Mariana Islands have adopted ATSC, as with the mainland in 1996.

== Patent holders ==
The following organizations held patents for the development of ATSC 1.0 technology, as listed in the patent pool administered by MPEG LA. The latest patents expired on 16 September 2024.

Organizations	Total patents (all expired)
LG Electronics	354
Zenith Electronics	54
Panasonic	50
Samsung Electronics	25
Columbia University	16
Mitsubishi Electric	14
JVC Kenwood	6
Cisco Technology, Inc.	4
Vientos Alisios Co., Ltd.	1
Philips	1

Patents for ATSC 3.0 are still active.

== See also ==
- Advanced Television Systems Committee
- ATSC tuner
- List of ATSC standards
- Broadcast flag
- Broadcast-safe
- Digital terrestrial television (DTT)
- Digital Video Broadcasting (DVB)
- CTA-708
- ISDB – Integrated Services Digital Broadcasting
- OpenCable
- Standard-definition television
- T-DMB – South Korean terrestrial mobile digital broadcasting system
- Digital Terrestrial Multimedia Broadcast (DMB-T/H) Chinese terrestrial digital broadcasting system
- Ultra-high-definition television (UHDTV) – Digital video formats with resolutions of 3840×2160 and 7680×4320
