= E-VSB =

Television enhancement improving reception where signals are weaker

E-VSB or Enhanced VSB is an optional enhancement to the original ATSC Standards that use the 8VSB modulation system used for transmission of digital television. It is intended for improving reception where signals are weaker, including fringe reception areas, and on portable devices such as handheld televisions or mobile phones. It does not cause problems to older receivers, but they cannot take advantage of its features. E-VSB was approved by the ATSC committee in 2004. However, it has been implemented by few stations or manufacturers.

For mobile applications, ATSC suffers significant signal degradation caused by the Doppler effect. Additionally, low-power handheld receivers are usually equipped with smaller antennas. These have a poor signal-to-noise ratio, which is disruptive to digital signals. The E-VSB standard provides for Reed–Solomon error correction to alleviate the data corruption caused by these issues.

Additionally, the standard can use either the MPEG-4 AVC or VC-1 video codecs. As these codecs have higher video compression than the original MPEG-2, they require less bandwidth.

As 8VSB lacks both link adaptation and hierarchical modulation of DVB, which would allow the SDTV part of an HDTV signal (or the LDTV part of SDTV) to be received even in fringe reception areas where signal strength is low, E-VSB yields a similar benefit. However, E-VSB places a significant processing overhead on the receiver, as well as a significant transmission overhead on the broadcaster's total bitrate. These are not a problem with DVB-H.

A-VSB is a different and, as of July 2008, unapproved addition to ATSC, which is also designed to send programming to mobile devices, and to allow for single-frequency networks. It is one of several proposals for ATSC-M/H, the as-yet undecided standard for mobile broadcasting via ATSC.

== See also ==
- ATSC-M/H
