= MMTP =

MMTP may refer to:

- MPEG media transport protocol
- Tapachula International Airport, Chiapas, Mexico, by ICAO code
