= ALCS (disambiguation) =

ALCS most commonly refers to the American League Championship Series in Major League Baseball.

ALCS may also refer to:

- Abundant Life Christian School, a K4-12 school in Madison, Wisconsin, best known for the shooting in 2024
- ALCS transaction monitor, an IBM mainframe transaction processing monitor for the airline industry
- Authors' Licensing and Collecting Society, a British organization for writers
- Airborne Launch Control System, the method of launching ICBMs during a nuclear attack

== See also ==
- ALC (disambiguation) for the singular of ALCs
