= ATSC-M/H =

American mobile digital TV standard

ATSC-M/H (Advanced Television Systems Committee - Mobile/Handheld) is a U.S. standard for mobile digital TV that allows TV broadcasts to be received by mobile devices.

ATSC-M/H is a mobile TV extension to preexisting terrestrial TV broadcasting standard ATSC A/53. It corresponds to the European DVB-H and 1seg extensions of DVB-T and ISDB-T terrestrial digital TV standards respectively. ATSC is optimized for a fixed reception in the typical North American environment and uses 8VSB modulation. The ATSC transmission method is not robust enough against Doppler shift and multipath radio interference in mobile environments, and is designed for highly directional fixed antennas. To overcome the issues, additional channel coding mechanisms are introduced in ATSC-M/H to protect the signal. As of 2021, ATSC-M/H is considered to have been a commercial failure.

== Evolution of mobile TV standard ==
=== Requirements ===
Several requirements of the new standard have been fixed since the beginning:

- Completely backward compatible with ATSC (A/53)
- Broadcasters can use their available license without additional restrictions
- Available legacy ATSC receivers can be used to receive the ATSC (A/53) standard without any modification.

=== Proposals ===
Ten systems from different companies were proposed, and two remaining systems were presented with transmitter and receiver prototypes:

- MPH (an acronym for mobile/pedestrian/handheld, suggesting miles per hour), was developed by LG Electronics and Harris Broadcast. (Zenith, a subsidiary of LG, developed much of the original ATSC system.)
- A-VSB (Advanced-VSB) was developed by Samsung and Rohde & Schwarz.

To find the best solution, the Advanced Television Systems Committee assigned the Open Mobile Video Coalition (OMVC) to test both systems. The test report was presented on May 15, 2008. As a result of this detailed work by the OMVC, a final standard draft was designed by the Advanced Television Systems Committee, specialist group S-4. ATSC-M/H will be a hybrid. Basically the following components of the proposed systems are used:

- RF-Layer from the MPH standard
- Deterministic frame structure from A-VSB
- Signaling of service designed on the base of the established mobile standards

=== Standard milestones ===
On December 1, 2008, the Advanced Television Systems Committee elevated its specification for Mobile Digital Television to Candidate Standard status. In the following six months, the industry tested the standard. Before it became an official standard, additional improvements were proposed.

- ATSC members approved the ballot on October 15, 2009, to official standard A/153.
- ATSC introduced in January 2010 at Consumer Electronics Show, the name and logo for "MDTV" for ATSC A/153.

== Structure of mobile DTV standard ==
The ATSC Mobile DTV standard ATSC-M/H (A/153) is modular in concept, with the specifications for each of the modules contained separate Parts. The individual Parts of A/153 are:

- Part 1 “ATSC Mobile DTV System” describes the overall ATSC Mobile DTV system and explains the organization of the standard. It also describes the explicit signaling requirements that are implemented by data structures throughout the other Parts.
- Part 2 “RF/Transmission System Characteristics” describes how the data is processed and placed into the VSB frame. Major elements include the Reed Solomon (RS) Frame, a Transmission Parameter Channel (TPC), and a Fast Information Channel (FIC).
- Part 3 “Service Multiplex and Transport Subsystem Characteristics” covers the service multiplex and transport subsystem, which comprises several layers in the stack. Major elements include Internet Protocol (IPv4), UniDirectional Protocol (UDP), Signaling Channel Service, FLUTE over Asynchronous Layered Coding (ALC) / Layered Coding Transport (LCT), Network Time Protocol (NTP) time service, and Real-time Transport Protocol (RTP) / RTP Control Protocol (RTCP).
- Part 4 “Announcement”: Part 4 covers Announcement, where services can optionally be announced using a Service Guide. The guide specified in Part 4 is based on an Open Mobile Alliance (OMA) broadcast (BCAST) OMA BCAST-Electronic program guide, with constraints and extensions.
- Part 5 “Application Framework” defines the Application framework, which enables the broadcaster of the audio-visual service to author and insert supplemental content to define and control various additional elements of the Rich Media Environment (RME).
- Part 6 “Service Protection” covers Service Protection, which refers to the protection of content, either files or streams, during delivery to a receiver. Major elements include the Right Issue Object and Short-Term Key Message (STKM).
- Part 7 “AVC and SVC Video System Characteristics” defines the Advanced Video Coding (AVC) and Scalable Video Coding (SVC) Video System in the ATSC Mobile DTV system. Additional elements covered in this Part included closed captioning (CEA 708) and Active Format Description (AFD).
- Part 8 “AHE AAC Audio System Characteristics” defines the High-Efficiency Advanced Audio Coding (HE-AAC v2) Audio System in the ATSC Mobile DTV system.
- Part 9 “Scalable Full Channel Mobile Mode”

== Principle ==
ATSC-M/H is a service for mobile TV receivers and partly uses the 19.39 Mbit/s ATSC 8VSB stream. The mobile data is carried in an unreferenced Packet ID, so legacy receivers ignore the mobile data.

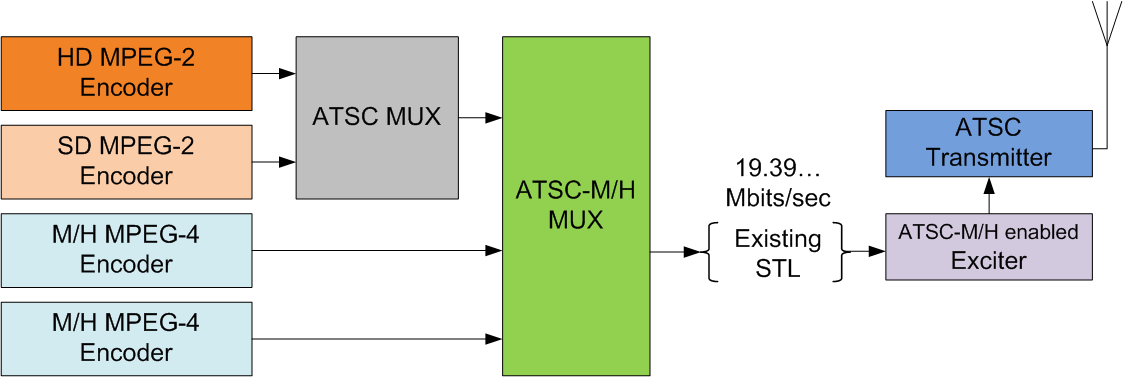
Block Diagram Headend

== Technology ==
ATSC-M/H bandwidth consumes fixed chunks of 917 kbit/s out of the total ATSC Bandwidth. Each such chunk is called an M/H Group. A data pipe called a parade is a collection of one to eight M/H groups. A parade conveys one or two ensembles which are logical pipes of IP datagrams. Those datagrams in turn carry TV services, System Signaling tables, OMA DRM key streams and the Electronic Service Guide. ATSC-M/H has an improved design based on detailed analyses of experiences with other mobile DTV standards.

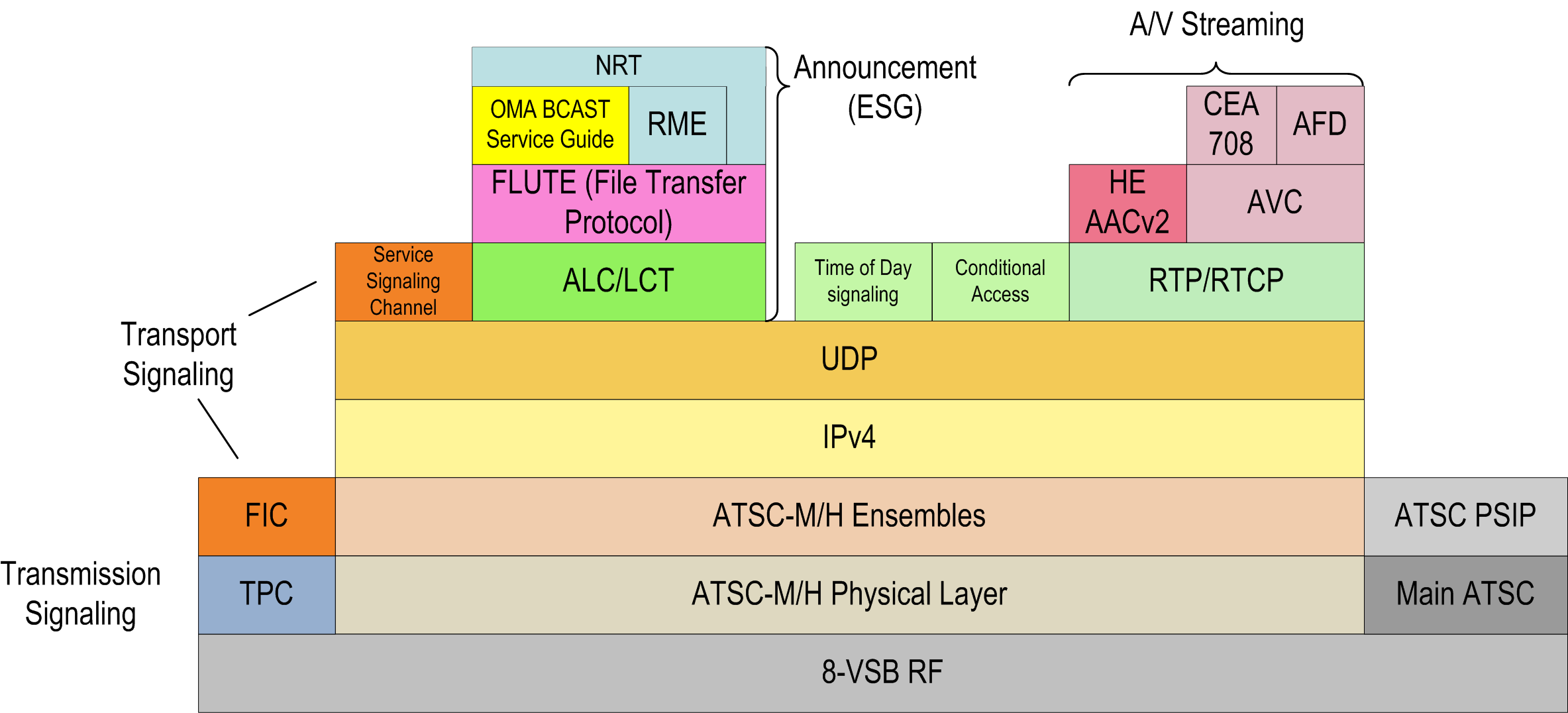
ATSC-M/H Layer Model

=== Protocol stack ===
ATSC-M/H protocol stack is mainly an umbrella protocol that uses OMA ESG, OMA DRM, MPEG-4 in addition to many IETF RFCs.

=== Transport stream data structure ===
The ATSC-M/H standard defines a fixed transport stream structure, based on M/H Frames, which establishes the location of M/H content within the VSB Frames and allows for easier processing by an M/H receiver. This is contrary to the legacy ATSC transport stream, defined in A/53, in which there is no fixed structure to establish the phase of the data relative to VSB Frames.

One M/H Frame is equivalent in size to 20 VSB Frames and has an offset of 37 transport stream (TS) packets relative to the beginning of the VSB Frame. Each M/H Frame, which has a fixed duration of 968 ms, is divided into five M/H sub-frames and each sub-frame is further subdivided into sixteen M/H Slots. Each slot is the equivalent amount of time needed to transmit 156 TS packets. A slot may either carry all main ATSC data (A/53) or 118 packets of M/H data and 38 packets of main data. The collection of 118 M/H packets transmitted within a slot is called an M/H Group. Each of the 118 M/H packets within an M/H Group are encapsulated inside a special TS packet, known as an MHE packet.

An M/H Parade is a collection of M/H Groups and can carry one or two M/H Ensembles. These Ensembles are logical pipes for IP datagrams. Those datagrams in turn carry TV services and the signaling of mobile content. The M/H Groups from a single Parade are placed within M/H Slots according to an algorithm defined in A/153 Part 2. The Number of Groups per M/H Sub-Frame (NoG) for an M/H Parade ranges from 1 to 8 and therefore the number of Groups per an M/H Frame for a Parade ranges from 5 to 40 with a step of 5. The data of a Parade are channel coded and distributed by an interleaver during an M/H Frame.

Mobile Data are protected by an additional FEC, as Interleaving and Convolutional codes. To improve the reception in the receiver, training sequences are introduced into the ATSC-M/H signal to allow channel estimation on the receiver side. Time slicing is a technique used by ATSC-M/H to provide power savings on receivers. It is based on the time-multiplexed transmission of different services.

=== Error protection ===
ATSC-M/H combines multiple error protection mechanisms for added robustness. One is an outer Reed–Solomon error correction code which corrects defective bytes after decoding the outer convolutional code in the receiver. The correction is improved by an additional CRC checksum since bytes can be marked as defective before they are decoded (erasure decoding).

The number of RS parity symbols can represent 24, 36 or 48. The symbols and the additional checksum form the outer elements of a data matrix which is allocated by the payload of the M/H Ensemble. The number of lines is fixed and the number of columns is variable according to how many slots per Subframe are occupied.

The RS Frame is then partitioned into several segments of different sizes and assigned to specified regions. The M/H data in these regions are protected by an SCCC (Series Concatenated Convolutional Code), incorporating a code rate of 1/2 or 1/4, and is specific to each region in a group. A 1/4 rate PCCC (Parallel Concatenated Convolutional Code) is also employed as an inner code for the M/H signaling channel, which includes FIC (Fast Information Channel) and TPC (Transmission Parameter Channel). The TPC carries various FEC modes and M/H Frame information. Once the TPC is extracted, the receiver then knows the code rates being employed and can decode each region at its specified rate.

A modified trellis encoder is also employed for backwards compatibility with legacy A/53 receivers. The time interleaving of ATSC-M/H is 1 second.

=== Signaling ===
ATSC M/H Signaling and Announcement defines three different layers of signalling. The layers are organized hierarchically and optimized to characteristics of the transmission layer.

- Transmission Signaling System is the lowest layer and uses the Transmission Parameter Channel (TPC). It provides information for the receiver needed to decode the signal
- Transport Signaling System is the second layer, which uses the Fast Information Channel (FIC) in combination with the Service Signaling Channel (SSC). The main purpose of the FIC is to deliver essential information to allow rapid service acquisition by the receiver. The Service Signaling Channel (SSC), consists of several different signaling tables. The information carried within these tables can be compared to the PSIP information of ATSC. The SSC provides mainly the basic information, the logical structure of the transmitted services and the decoding parameters for video and audio.
- Announcement / Electronic Service Guide (ESG) is the highest layer of signaling. It uses the Open Mobile Alliance (OMA) Broadcast Service Enabler Suite (OMA BCAST) Electronic Service Guide (ESG). An ESG is delivered as a file data session File Delivery over Unidirectional Transport (FLUTE), and is used as the delivery protocol. The ESG consists of several XML sections. With this structure, a program guide and enabled interactive services could be realized.

=== Signaling of video- and audio coding ===
Each video- or audio decoder needs information about the used coding parameters, for instance resolution, frame rate and IDR (Random Access Point) repetition rate. In MPEG-4/AVC, mobile TV systems the receiver uses information from the Session Description Protocol File (SDP-File). The SDP-file is a format which describes streaming media initialization parameters. In ATSC-M/H, the SDP-File is transmitted within the SMT-Table. Most of the information is coded in binary, but some is coded in the original ASCII text format. The SMT-Table combines information that is typically in different tables and reduces the complexity for the network and the receivers. In case of signaling with ESG, the complete SDP-File is transmitted.

=== Single-frequency network (SFN) ===
In an SFN, two or more transmitters with an overlapping coverage send the same program content simultaneously on the same frequency. The 8VSB modulation used by ATSC allows SFN transmissions. To allow regular channel approximation, ATSC-M/H provides additional training sequences. ATSC A/110 defines a method to synchronize the ATSC modulator as part of the transmitter. The A/110 standard sets up the Trellis coder in a pre-calculated way to all transmitters of the SFN. In such an SFN, the ATSC-M/H multiplexer and the ATSC-M/H transmitter are synchronized by a GPS reference. The ATSC-M/H multiplexer operates as a network adapter and inserts time stamps in the MPEG transport stream. The transmitter analyzes the time stamp, delays the transport stream before it is modulated and transmitted. Eventually, all SFN transmitters generate a synchronized signal.

== Dyle Mobile TV ==
Dyle mobile TV was operated by Mobile Content Venture, a joint-venture of 12 major broadcast groups to broadcast and market ATSC-M/H. At its peak, signals were available in 38 markets, reaching 57 percent of the U.S. Unfortunately, the system was not a commercial success, and broadcasts were terminated.

== Other mobile standards ==
Until its shutdown, MediaFLO was available in parts of the United States. It was a premium service which required subscription. ATSC-M/H was free to air, as are regular broadcast signals. Both standards were designed without sufficient consideration of the continued growth of the internet and mobile platforms which today provide excellent multimedia capabilities using only web-centric codecs and protocols rather than repurposing of existing standards suited to legacy broadcasting.
