= Andrea Lieberman =

American fashion designer

- Education: Parsons School of Design
- Occupation: Fashion Designer
- Website: alcltd.com

Andrea Lieberman is an American fashion designer and founder of women's ready-to-wear line A.L.C.

== Career ==
Born in New York City, Lieberman graduated from Parsons School of Design with a Bachelor of Fine Arts degree in Fashion. During her time at Parsons, she interned with designer Giorgio di Sant' Angelo and after graduating she worked in the press room for Romeo Gigli. Before becoming a personal stylist, Lieberman opened her first boutique in New York, called Culture and Reality.

She began her career as a stylist in the music industry styling hip hop figures such as Sean Combs. Her work with Combs led to an introduction to Jennifer Lopez whom she styled for magazine editorials, music videos, red carpet appearances. She styled Jennifer Lopez in a green silk chiffon Versace dress for the 2000 Grammy Awards, which was listed as one of the "Top Grammy Dresses of All Time" according to InStyle. In January 2015, Google's president Eric Schmidt cited the massive attention to this dress as a motivation for the creation of Google Images search. Her work with Lopez also included spreads in Vibe magazine and Lopez’ music video for "I'm Real" in 2001. Lieberman styled Janet Jackson for her All for You Tour in 2001 during which she worked with Francis Lawrence.

Lieberman met Gwen Stefani in 2001 while working with Eve on the music video "Let Me Blow Ya Mind." In 2004, Lieberman designed costumes for Stefani's Love. Angel. Music. Baby. album cover and the album's solo tour. She styled Stefani’s Harajuku Girl look for the music video "What You Waiting For?" Lieberman served as creative consultant for Stefani's L.A.M.B clothing line. In 2005, Lieberman styled Mary J. Blige for the album cover for her hit single "Be Without You."

Additionally, Lieberman worked with Hollywood stars such as Gwyneth Paltrow, Drew Barrymore, Kate Hudson and Cameron Diaz. Her editorial styling work appeared in Vogue, Vanity Fair, Elle, InStyle, and other publications.

In 2007 Lieberman introduced a line of fine jewelry sold exclusively at Barneys New York and Maxfield Los Angeles.

In 2009, Lieberman moved to Los Angeles and debuted her A.L.C. ready-to-wear collection. In 2011, Lieberman was accepted into the Council of Fashion Designers of America and the following year, she became one of ten finalists in the CFDA/Vogue Fashion Fund.
