= 2VSB =

Type of vestigial sideband modulation

In telecommunications, 2VSB is an abbreviation for 2-level vestigial sideband modulation, a transmission method capable of transmitting one bit (2^{1}=2) at a time.

Other faster but less rugged forms include 4VSB, 8VSB, and 16VSB.
