= 4VSB =

Type of vestigial sideband modulation

4VSB is an abbreviation for 4-level vestigial sideband modulation, a type of radio transmission capable of transmitting two bits of information (2^{2}=4) at a time. Other faster but less rugged forms include 8VSB and 16VSB. While 2VSB is more rugged, it is also slower.
