= 16VSB =

Type of vestigial sideband modulation

16VSB is an abbreviation for 16-level vestigial sideband modulation, capable of transmitting four bits (2^{4}=16) at a time.

== How it works ==
Other slower but more rugged forms of VSB include 2VSB, 4VSB, and 8VSB. 16VSB is capable of twice the data capacity of 8VSB; while 8VSB delivers 19.39 Mbit/s (Megabits per second) in a 6-MHz television channel, 16VSB could deliver 38.78 Mbit/s, while making the sacrifice of being more prone to transmission error.

== History ==
While 8VSB is the ATSC digital broadcast modulation format, 16VSB was planned for cable distribution. 16VSB is about twice as susceptible to noise, therefore less suitable than 8VSB for broadcast, but well suited to the signal-to-noise ratio of hybrid fiber-coax distribution, allowing twice as much programming in a 6-MHz channel.

== Technological obsolescence ==
As of 2007, a majority of cable companies have chosen to extend their existing quadrature amplitude modulation-based systems to carry digital television rather than adopting any form of VSB. It is probable that 16VSB has been replaced by Digital Transmission Standard For Cable Television a cable standard that defines 64QAM and 256QAM transmission for digital cable.
