= Australian Logistics Council =

The Australian Logistics Council (ALC) is an industry association for the freight transport and supply chain logistics industry in Australia. ALC members span the entire supply chain, including the road, rail, sea and air freight sectors.

ALC supports appropriate national regulation and infrastructure to ensure Australia enjoys the full benefits of freight transport and logistics policy development and reform. It focuses its advocacy efforts on practical measures that will boost productivity, increase efficiency and improve safety in the freight logistics industry.

== Governance ==
ALC is governed by a Board which comprises senior executives from ALC member organisations.

Policy committees inform the development of ALC's position on key freight logistics issues. These include an infrastructure policy committee, regulation policy committee and safety policy committee. ALC has also established a number of working groups involving industry to progress issues of importance to the freight logistics industry.

ALC is based in Canberra at the National Press Club.

== ALC Safety Codes ==
ALC has established a National Logistics Safety Code (NLSC) which clearly sets out all participants' responsibilities when they control or influence the movement of freight in the supply chain. There are three signatories to the NLSC - the Retail Logistics Supply Chain Code of Practice (RLSC), the Steel Code and the Coal Seam Gas Logistics Safety Code.

== ALC Events ==
ALC holds an annual forum to discuss the critical issues facing the freight transport and logistics industry. Held annually, this two-day event involves 300 senior leaders from industry and government and also includes the ALC Annual Dinner.
