= A.L.C. =

A.L.C. is a Los Angeles-based women's ready-to-wear fashion brand, founded in 2009 by Andrea Lieberman.

== History ==
Andrea Lieberman began her career as a stylist in New York City, working primarily in the music industry with hip hop figures such as Sean Combs and musicians such as Jennifer Lopez and Gwen Stefani. Her styling projects included music videos, red-carpet appearances, and music tour costumes.

Lieberman worked with Hollywood stars such as Gwyneth Paltrow, Drew Barrymore, Kate Hudson and Cameron Diaz.

Her editorial styling work appeared in Vogue, Vanity Fair, Elle, InStyle and other publications.

In 2009, Lieberman moved to Los Angeles and debuted her ready-to-wear collection, A.L.C. The brand focuses on "laid-back luxury" with collections consisting of elegant staples and elevated basics.

In 2011, Lieberman was accepted into the Council of Fashion Designers of America and the following year, she became one of ten finalists in the CFDA/Vogue Fashion Fund.

In 2014, the brand launched a line of handbags, which are sold at Saks Fifth Avenue, Barneys, Shopbop.com, and Intermix, among other specialty boutiques.

In March 2015, Emma Watson wore A.L.C. while participating in a Facebook Live event for International Women's Day in which she discussed her work as the UN Women Global Goodwill Ambassador representing the HeForShe movement.

In August 2015, Interluxe Holdings, a New York-based fashion and luxury investment firm, acquired a majority stake in A.L.C.

In October 2015, Jennifer Lawrence wore A.L.C. while attending the Handprint Ceremony at the TCL Chinese Theatre with her cast members from The Hunger Games franchise.

In 2018, A.L.C. opened its first two retail locations in SoHo, New York and at Palisades Village in Pacific Palisades, California.

== Website ==
alcltd.com (official)
