= MPEG-H =

Set of standards for multimedia file and streaming formats

MPEG-H is a group of international standards under development by the ISO/IEC Moving Picture Experts Group (MPEG). It has various "parts" – each of which can be considered a separate standard. These include a media transport protocol standard, a video compression standard, an audio compression standard, a digital file format container standard, three reference software packages, three conformance testing standards, and related technologies and technical reports. The group of standards is formally known as ISO/IEC 23008 – High efficiency coding and media delivery in heterogeneous environments. Development of the standards began around 2010, and the first fully approved standard in the group was published in 2013. Most of the standards in the group have been revised or amended several times to add additional extended features since their first edition.

MPEG-H consists of the following parts:

- Part 1: MPEG Media Transport (MMT) – a media streaming format similar to the Real-time Transport Protocol that is adaptable to different networks
- Part 2: High Efficiency Video Coding (HEVC, jointly developed with the ITU-T Video Coding Experts Group and also published as ITU-T H.265) – a video compression standard that doubles the data compression ratio compared to H.264/MPEG-4 AVC
- Part 3: 3D Audio – an audio compression standard for 3D audio that can support many loudspeakers
- Part 4: MMT Reference and Conformance Software (not yet published)
- Part 5: Reference Software for High Efficiency Video Coding (also published as ITU-T H.265.2)
- Part 6: 3D Audio Reference Software
- Part 7: MMT Conformance (not yet published)
- Part 8: Conformance Specification for HEVC (also published as ITU-T H.265.1)
- Part 9: 3D Audio Conformance Testing
- Part 10: MPEG Media Transport Forward Error Correction Codes
- Part 11: MPEG Media Transport Composition Information
- Part 12: Image File Format – a.k.a. High Efficiency Image File Format (HEIF), based on the ISO base media file format
- Part 13: MPEG Media Transport Implementation Guidelines (a technical report rather than a standard)
- Part 14: Conversion and Coding Practices for HDR/WCG Y′CbCr 4:2:0 Video with PQ Transfer Characteristics (a technical report also published as ITU-T H-series supplement 15)
- Part 15: Signalling, backward compatibility and display adaptation for HDR/WCG video (a technical report also published as ITU-T H-series supplement 18)
