= Action with Lao Children =

Action with Lao children (ALC) is a non-governmental, non-profit organisation in Laos. ALC aims to achieve a fair global society by improving the dissemination of education so as to equip children with the rights and ability to create their own future. ALC focuses on promoting literacy education and creating a conducive environment to nurture children's ability to learn by themselves.

Founded in 1982 by Chanthasone Inthavong, ALC first started as the "Association for sending picture books to Lao children", then expanded their activities to include the publishing of books in Laos. Their activities started in Japan and spread into Laos where Laotians took charge. They have currently two offices situated in Laos and Japan.
