= A-VSB =

Modification of the 8VSB modulation system

A-VSB or Advanced VSB is a modification of the 8VSB modulation system used for transmission of digital television using the ATSC system. One of the constraints of conventional ATSC transmission is that reliable reception is difficult or impossible when the receiver is moving at speeds associated with normal vehicular traffic. The technology was jointly developed by Samsung and Rohde & Schwarz.

A-VSB builds on the existing ATSC transmission standard to enhance DTV receivers’ ability to receive the main MPEG transport stream in dynamic environments. The system enables broadcasters to include multiple streams with additional error correction and time diversity encoding for enhanced reception. In addition, A-VSB facilitates synchronization of multiple transmission towers, which should improve coverage with higher uniform signal strength throughout a service area, even in locations that normally would be shielded by obstacles such as hills or buildings.

A-VSB incorporates three new elements: a Supplementary Reference Signal (SRS), a Scalable Turbo Stream (STS), and support for Single Frequency Networks (SFN).

== Supplementary Reference Signal ==
A-VSB receivers utilize the SRS in order to remain synchronized with the transmission. This helps maintain reception of the main stream and any turbo streams even with rapidly changing multipath interference, such as when the signal is reflected from moving objects near the receiver or when the receiver itself is moving.

The SRS adds an additional equalizer training sequence to the Transport Stream Adaptation Field, which should be ignored by existing transport decoders. The added signal shortens the existing 24ms equalizer update time by a selectable factor, from 120x to 312x. A receiver equipped with this new equalizer can track rapid multipath fading, and thus supports mobile reception. SRS can be used alone, without the STS, offering a slight improvement in portable (stationary—not true mobile) service.

== Scalable Turbo Stream ==
The addition of a new turbo-coded stream enables broadcasters to increase the error-correction capability of a secondary stream transmission. Two options are proposed for the turbo stream: ½ and ¼ rate codes, i.e., the new video stream requires 2x or 4x the video rate in final transport payload. The new Threshold of Visibility (TOV) SNRs are 9.6 and 4.5 dB, respectively; 1.6dB is claimed with diversity reception. Conventional 8VSB has a TOV SNR of 15.1 dB. The turbo codec uses single-input single-output (SISO) iterative decoding and time interleaving.

== Single Frequency Networks ==
The last option—SFN—is made possible by adding a VSB Frame Initialization Packet (VFIP) that synchronizes the transport frame sequences to a GPS reference.
