= Education in Laos =

In 2005, the literacy rate in Laos was estimated to be 73% (83% male and 63% female).

The Human Rights Measurement Initiative (HRMI) finds that Laos is fulfilling 74.0% of what it should be fulfilling for the right to education based on the country's level of income. HRMI breaks down the right to education by looking at the rights to primary education and secondary education. While taking into consideration Laos' income level, the nation is achieving 84.0% of what should be possible based on its resources (income) for primary education and 64.0% for secondary education.

== Before 1975 ==
Of the ethnic groups in Laos, only the Lao Loum had a tradition of formal education, reflecting the fact that the languages of the other groups had no written script. Until the 20th century, education was primarily based in the Buddhist temple school (wat school), where the monks taught novices and other boys to read Lao and Pali scripts, basic arithmetic, and other religious and social subjects. Some villages had wat schools for novices and other village boys. Ordained boys and men in urban monasteries had access to advanced study.

Post-secondary education was not available in Laos, and some students traveled to Hanoi, Danang, and Hué in Vietnam and to Phnom Penh in Cambodia for specialized training; fewer continued with university-level studies in France.

The Pathet Lao began to provide Lao language instruction in the schools under its control in the 1950s, and a Laotian curriculum began to be developed in the 1960s in the RLG schools. In 1970 about 1-third of the civilian employees of the RLG were teachers. At that time, there were about 200,000 elementary students enrolled in RLG schools, around 36% of the school-age population.

== Since 1975 ==
A goal of the Lao People's Democratic Republic (LPDR) government was to establish a system of universal primary education by 1985. The LPDR took over the existing Royal Lao Government education system that had been established in 1950s and restructured it, facing some of the problems that had confronted previous governments. The French system of education was replaced with a Laotian curriculum.

An adult literacy campaign was initiated in 1983-84, which mobilized educated persons living in villages and urban neighborhoods to bring basic reading and writing skills to over 750,000 adults. Largely as a result of this campaign, those able to read and write had increased to an estimated 44%. According to the United Nations, by 1985 those able to read and write were estimated at 92% of men and 76% of women ages 15 to 45.

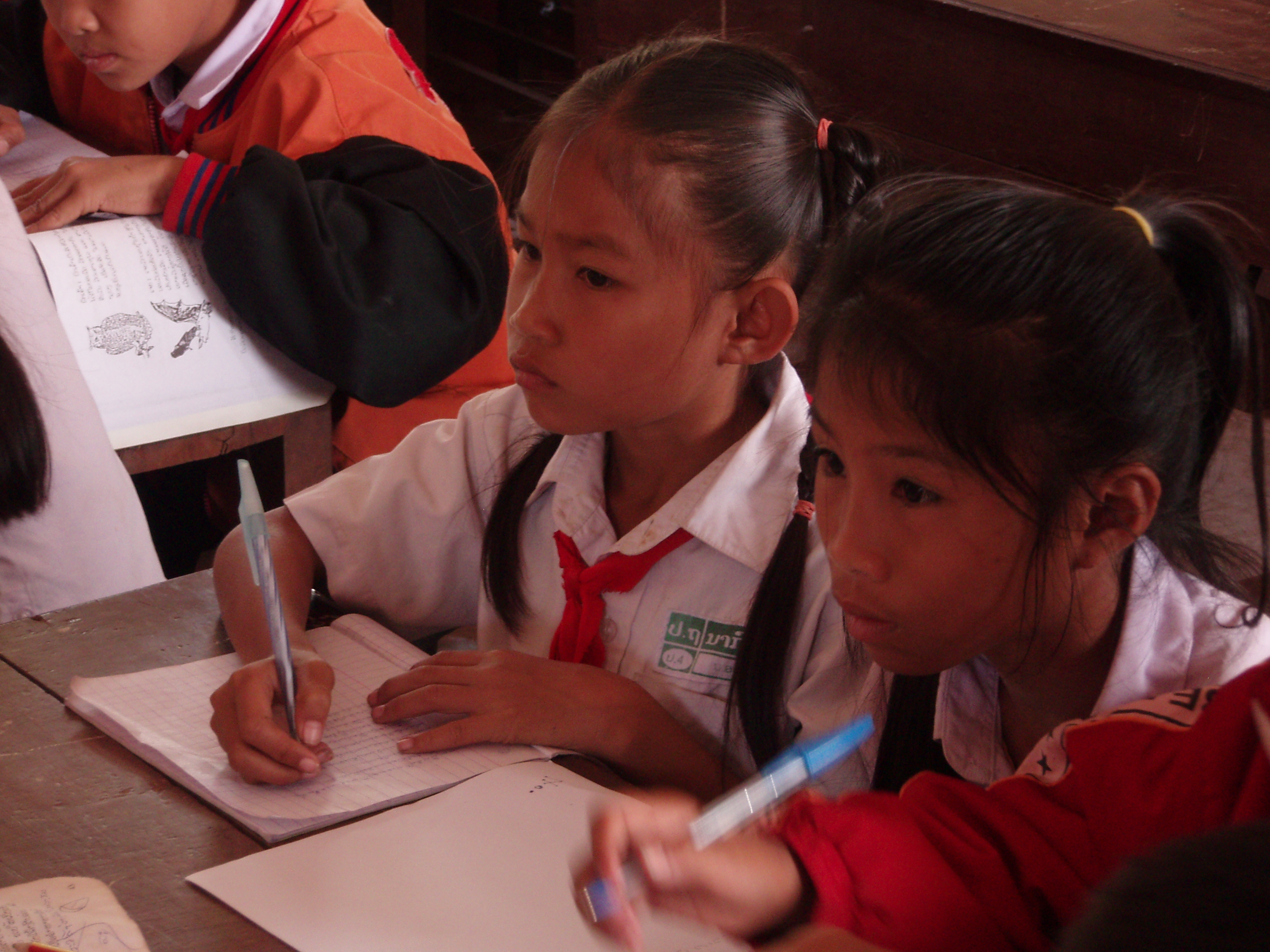
Students in a village school in southern Laos

The decision to establish universal education led the government to focus its efforts on building and staffing schools. Most schools are constructed of bamboo and thatch and staffed by 1 or 2 teachers. Some village schools have 1 or 2 grades.

School enrollment has increased since 1975. In 1988 primary school enrollment was estimated at 63% of all school-age children. In 1992-93 an estimated 603,000 students were in primary school, compared to 317,000 students in 1976 and 100,000 students in 1959. The goal of achieving universal primary education was postponed from 1985 to 2000 as a result of the lack of resources.

Because teachers are paid irregularly, they are forced to spend time farming or in other livelihood activities. Because of irregular classes, overcrowding, and lack of learning resources, the average student needed 11 to 12 years to complete the 5-year primary course in the 1980s. Repetition rates ranged from 40% for the first grade to 14% for the fifth grade. 22% of all entering first graders left school before the second grade. In the 1980s, 45% of entering first graders completed all 5 years of primary school, up from 18% in 1969.

Performance statistics vary according to rural-urban location, ethnic group, and gender. Enrollment and school quality are higher in urban areas, where the usefulness of a formal education is more evident than in rural farming communities. Isolated teachers confronted with primitive rural living and teaching conditions have a difficult time maintaining their own commitment and the interest of their pupils. Unless the teacher is of the same or similar ethnic group as the students, communication and culturally appropriate education are limited. Because of these factors, in the 1980s the enrollment rate for the Lao Sung was less than half that of the Lao Loum.

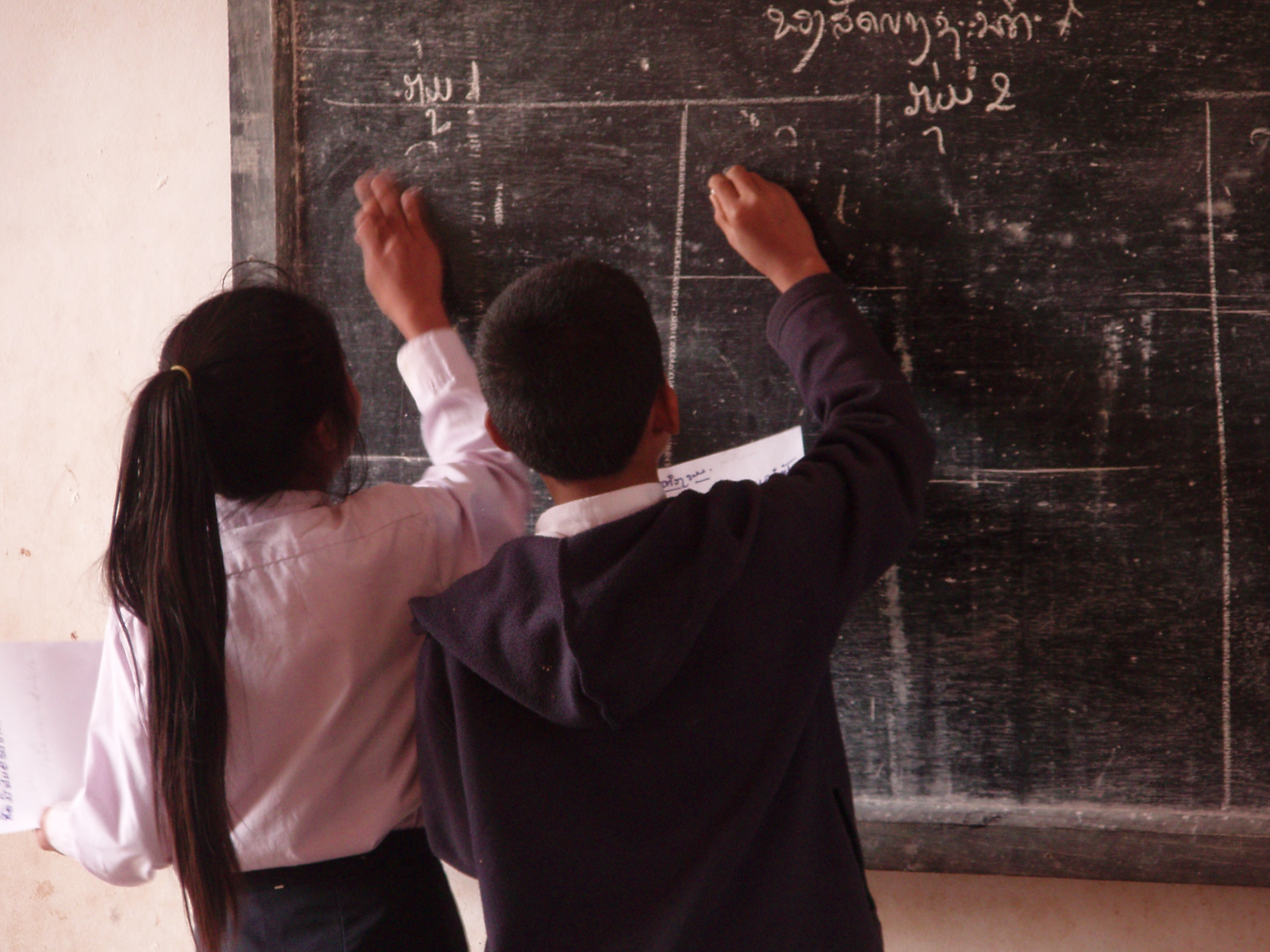
Students writing on the blackboard in a village school

Girls are less likely than boys to attend school and attend for fewer years—a discrepancy that was declining in the 1990s. In 1969 37% of students in primary school were girls; by 1989, 44% of primary school students were girls. Because of Lao Sung cultural attitudes toward girls' and women's responsibilities, girls in these groups accounted for 26% of all students.

In 1992-93 about 130,000 students were enrolled in all postprimary programs, including lower- and upper-secondary schools, vocational programs, and teacher-training schools. The exodus of Laotian elite after 1975 deprived vocational and secondary schools of some of their staff, a situation that was partly offset by students returning from training in socialist countries. Between 1975 and 1990, the government granted over 14,000 scholarships for study in at least 8 socialist countries: over 7,000 were to the Soviet Union, followed by 2,500 to Vietnam, and 1,800 to the German Democratic Republic (East Germany).

In 1994 the school year was 9 months. The ideal sequence included 5 years of primary school, followed by 3 years of lower-secondary school and 3 years of upper-secondary school. In 2010, another year was added to upper-secondary school, for a total of 12 years of primary and secondary education. Some students go directly from primary or lower-secondary school to vocational instruction, for example, in teacher-training schools or agriculture schools.

Local secondary education is concentrated in the provincial capitals and some district centers. Dropout rates for students at secondary and technical schools are not as high as among primary students, and the gender and ethnic group differentials are more pronounced. In the 1980s, 7% of lower-secondary students were Lao Sung or Lao Theung, a rate that dropped to 3% in upper-secondary school. For most students who do not live in a provincial center, attendance at secondary school requires boarding away from home in makeshift facilities. This situation further discourages students in rural areas from pursuing further education, with additional differential impacts on girls and minorities. Vientiane has the majority of advanced schools, including the national teachers' training school at Dong Dok, the irrigation college at Tad Thong, the agriculture college at Na Phok, the National Polytechnic Institute, and the University of Medical Sciences.

In 1986 the government began to reform the education system, with the goals of linking educational development more closely to the socioeconomic situation in each locality, improving science training and emphasis, expanding networks to remote mountainous regions, and recruiting minority teachers. The plan envisioned making education more relevant to daily realities and building increased cooperation in educational activities among the ministries, mass organizations, and the community. The ability to implement this program through its scheduled completion in 2000 depended on a budgetary increase to the education sector in addition to receiving foreign aid. Education accounted for 8% of government expenditures in 1988, down from a 10% to 15% range during the preceding 7-year period.

== Bibliography ==
- Evans, Grant. 1998. The politics of ritual and remembrance: Laos since 1975. Honolulu: University of Hawaii Press.
- Evans, Grant. 2002. A short history of Lao : the land in between . Crowns Nest, NSW: Allen & Unwin.
- Faming, Manynooch. 2007. "Schooling in the Lao People's Democratic Republic" in Going to school in East Asia, edited by Gerard A. Postiglione and Jason Tan. Westport, Conn.; London : Greenwood Press (pp: 170-206).
- Faming, Manynooch. 2008. National Integration: Education for Ethnic Minorities in Laos. Ph.D. Thesis, Hong Kong: University of Hong Kong.
- Fry, Gerald W. 2002. "Laos—Education System" in Encyclopedia of Modern Asia, edited by David Levinson and Karen Christensen. New York : Charles Scribner's Group : Thomson/Gale.
