= Asynchronous Layered Coding =

Asynchronous Layered Coding (ALC) is an Internet protocol for content delivery in a reliable, massively scalable, multiple-rate, and congestion-controlled manner. Specified in RFC 5775, it is an IETF proposed standard.

The protocol is specifically designed to provide massive scalability using IP multicast as the underlying network service. Massive scalability in this context means the number of concurrent receivers for an object is potentially in the millions, the aggregate size of objects to be delivered in a session ranges from hundreds of kilobytes to hundreds of gigabytes, each receiver can initiate reception of an object asynchronously, the reception rate of each receiver in the session is the maximum fair bandwidth available between that receiver and the sender, and all of this can be supported using a single sender.

Because ALC is focused on reliable content delivery, the goal is to deliver objects as quickly as possible to each receiver while at the same time remaining network friendly to competing traffic. Thus, the congestion control used in conjunction with ALC should strive to maximize use of available bandwidth between receivers and the sender while at the same time backing off aggressively in the face of competing traffic.

The sender side of ALC consists of generating packets based on objects to be delivered within the session and sending the appropriately formatted packets at the appropriate rates to the channels associated with the session. The receiver side of ALC consists of joining appropriate channels associated with the session, performing congestion control by adjusting the set of joined channels associated with the session in response to detected congestion, and using the packets to reliably reconstruct objects. All information flow in an ALC session is in the form of data packets sent by a single sender to channels that receivers join to receive data.

ALC does specify the Session Description needed by receivers before they join a session, but the mechanisms by which receivers obtain this required information is outside the scope of ALC. An application that uses ALC may require that receivers report statistics on their reception experience back to the sender, but the mechanisms by which receivers report back statistics is outside the scope of ALC. In general, ALC is designed to be a minimal protocol instantiation that provides reliable content delivery without unnecessary limitations to the scalability of the basic protocol.

== Implementations ==
- Tampere University of Technology MAD/TUT
- TZI Papageno
- INRIA
