= MPEG media transport =

Digital container standard

- Developed by: MPEG
- Initial release: 2013
- Type of format: Digital container format
- Container for: Audio, video, data
- Standard: ISO/IEC 23008-1

MPEG media transport (MMT), specified as ISO/IEC 23008-1 (MPEG-H Part 1), is a digital container standard developed by Moving Picture Experts Group (MPEG) that supports High Efficiency Video Coding (HEVC) video. MMT was designed to transfer data using the all-Internet Protocol (All-IP) network.

== History ==
In April 2013 a list of requirements was released for MMT and the general requirements stated that MMT must have clear advantages when compared to existing container formats and that it must have low computational demands. Also in April 2013 a list of use cases for MMT was released which included the need for it to support Ultra HD video content, 3D video content, interactive content, user-generated content, applications that support multi-device presentation, subtitles, picture-in-picture video, and multiple audio tracks. MPEG has estimated that the first edition of MMT will reach Final Draft International Standard (FDIS) in November 2013.

On May 30, 2013, NHK started showing test equipment based on MMT at the NHK Science & Technology Research Laboratories Open House 2013.

== Schedule ==
The timescale for the completion of the first version of the MMT standard in the MPEG standardization process:

- October 2010: Call for Proposals
- March 2011: Working Draft
- July 2012: Committee Draft
- January 2013: 2nd Committee Draft
- April 2013: Draft International Standard
- November 2013: Final Draft International Standard
- May 2014: International Standard published

== Highlights ==
MPEG MMT succeeds MPEG-2 TS as the media transport solution for broadcasting and IP network content distribution, with the aim of serving new applications like UHDTV, second screen, ..., etc., with full support of HTML5 and simplification of packetization and synchronization with a pure IP based transport. It has the following technology innovations:

- Convergence of IP transport and HTML 5 presentation
- Multiplexing of various streaming components from different sources
- Simplification of TS stack and easy conversion between storage file format and streaming format
- Support multiple devices and hybrid delivery
- Advanced QoS/QoE engineering features

== Solutions and demos ==
- SKT MMT-based True Realtime (TR) video streaming solution (Oct' 2014)

SK Telecom (The leading mobile operator in Korea) and Samsung have developed and tested their True Real-Time Mobile Streaming system based on the emerging MPEG MMT standard over SKT's commercial LTE network with Btv video streaming platform. The results showed a latency reduction of 80%, which would significantly improve the user experience of live content streaming. Current mobile video streaming technologies often suffer up to 15 seconds of latency, but its implementation of MMT has reduced that to 3 seconds. SK Telecom said they will put more effort to strengthen their mobile network service quality by developing innovative and advanced technologies with the aim of having it commercially available next year.

- Technicolor-Sinclair Demo (Oct 2014)

Sinclair Broadcast Group and Technicolor delivered successfully ATSC 3.0 4K UHD testbed platform. The Technicolor platform, based on open audio, video, and transport standards including Scalable HEVC (SHVC), MPEG-H audio, and MPEG-MMT transport, has been integrated into Sinclair's experimental OFDM transmission system in Baltimore, Maryland. The impact of this deployment is that broadcasters will be able to deliver the highest quality content, inclusive of 4K UHD broadcast in a simultaneous transmission to consumers both at home and on the go.

- NHK MMT UHD system demo (May, 2014)

In Japan, Super Hi-Vision test services are planned to begin in 2016, and commercial services are planned to begin in 2020. NHK has studied MPEG Media Transport (MMT) as the transport protocol for the next generation of broadcasting systems since it enables hybrid delivery using broadcasting and broadband networks. They have demonstrated MMT-based 8K Super Hi-Vision Broadcasting at their open house exhibition.

- libatsc3 Android Sample App with MMT MFU playback (January 2020)

libatsc3 provides an ATSC 3.0 NGBP Open Source Library - Tools for parsing and decoding STLTP, LMT, LLS, SLS, and NextGen supported standards. In January 2020, libatsc3 released a baseline Android sample app providing PCAP playback of ROUTE/DASH and implemented the world's first open-source MMT player with MFU (Media Fragmentation Unit) de-encapsulation. By using the MFU for media essence decoding (e.g. single samples are pushed to the media decoder), rather than the traditional MPU (Media Presentation Unit) of ISOBMFF and DASH, the baseline NGBP implementation can provide robust media playback regardless of packetized DU (data unit) loss, transient MFU loss, or sustained MPU loss.

Rapid recovery and de-encapsulation durability are also enabled by implementing out-of-order de-packetization using the MMTHSample hint at the start of every media sample - providing the sample number, data unit length, and offset. Other implementations relying on ISOBMFF with MOOF and TRUN box provide only one emission of sample length and duration MPU, posing a high risk of full GOP loss disproportionate to the MDAT size (e.g. 1KB of ALC packet loss may result up to the loss of ~1MB or more of the essence). libatsc3 is designed to be robust and durable in inherently lossy ATSC 3.0 IP-multicast emissions, including mobile reception, to demonstrate the potential of NextGen across all devices and platforms. More information at libatsc3 Overview.

- libatsc3 ExoPlayer MMT Plugin with MFU de-packetization and out-of-order mode support (February 2021)

Expanding on the libatsc3 android proof-of-concept, ONEMedia 3.0 and ngbp.org have developed an ExoPlayer plugin for MMT, including support for MFU de-packetization and out-of-order mode support. Source and sample Android Activity available on GitHub: ExoPlayer ISO23008-1 MMT extension

== See also ==
- ISO base media file format — a previous digital container standard created by MPEG and defined in ISO/IEC 14496-12
- MPEG transport stream — a previous digital container standard created by MPEG and defined in ISO/IEC 13818-1
- MPEG program stream — a previous digital container standard created by MPEG and defined in ISO/IEC 13818-1
