= Advanced Television Systems Committee =

American digital television standards organization

- Abbreviation: ATSC
- Established: 1982; 44 years ago
- Location: United States
- Region served: Worldwide
- President: Madeleine Noland
- President Emeritus: Mark Richer
- Website: www.atsc.org

The Advanced Television Systems Committee (ATSC) is an international nonprofit organization developing technical standards for digital terrestrial television and data broadcasting. ATSC's 120-plus member organizations represent the broadcast, broadcast equipment, motion picture, consumer electronics, computer, cable, satellite and semiconductor industries.

ATSC was initially formed in 1982 to develop a first-generation digital television standard that could replace existing analog transmission systems. The new digital system became known as "ATSC 1.0." ATSC 1.0 is in use in the United States, Canada, Mexico, South Korea and Honduras, and also in the Dominican Republic.

ATSC then developed a next-generation digital television standard known as "ATSC 3.0." ATSC 3.0 was commercially deployed in South Korea in May 2017 and was approved for voluntary use in the United States in November 2017.

== See also ==
- ATSC standards
- ATSC tuner
- Broadcast flag – Bits in a digital television program that indicates recording restrictions
- CEA-708 – Standard for closed captioning for ATSC digital television
- Grand Alliance (HDTV)
