= Video decoder =

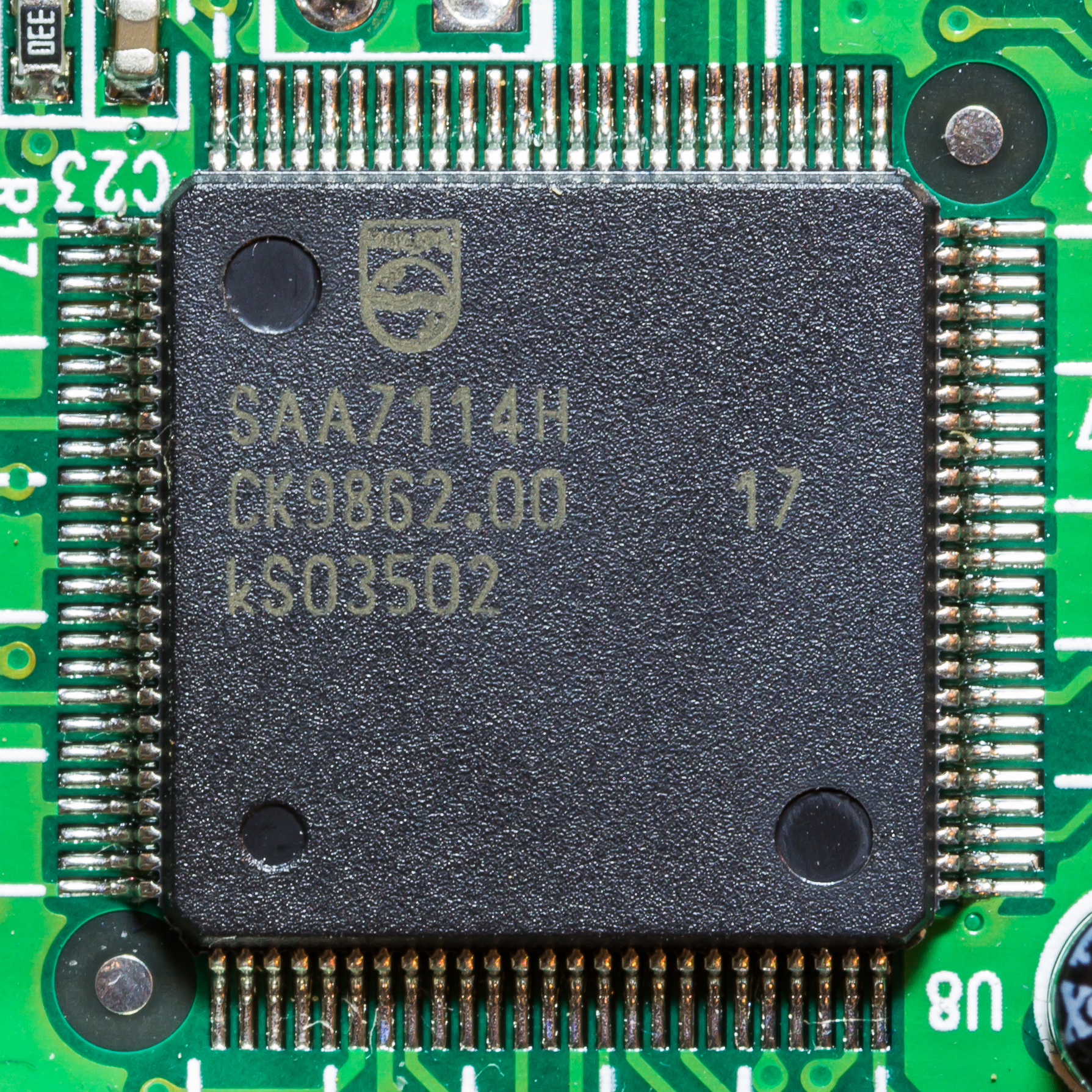
Integrated circuit video decoder (Philips SAA7114H)

A video decoder is an electronic circuit, often contained within a single integrated circuit chip, that converts base-band analog video signals to digital video. Video decoders commonly allow programmable control over video characteristics such as hue, contrast, and saturation. A video decoder performs the inverse function of a video encoder, which converts raw (uncompressed) digital video to analog video. Video decoders are commonly used in video capture devices and frame grabbers.

== Signals ==
The input signal to a video decoder is analog video that conforms to a standard format. For example, a standard definition (SD) decoder accepts (composite or S-Video) that conforms to SD formats such as NTSC or PAL. High definition (HD) decoders accept analog HD formats such as AHD, HD-TVI, or HD-CVI.

The output digital video may be formatted in various ways, such as 8-bit or 16-bit 4:2:2, 12-bit 4:1:1, BT.656 (SD) or BT.1120 (HD). Usually, in addition to the digital video output bus, a video decoder will also generate a clock signal and other signals such as:

- Sync — indicates the beginning of a video frame
- Blanking — indicates video blanking interval
- Field — indicates whether the current video field is even or odd (applies to interlaced formats)
- Lock — indicates the decoder has detected and is locked (synchronized) to a valid analog input video signal

== Functional blocks ==
The main functional blocks of a video decoder typically include these:

- Analog processors
- Y/C (luminance/chrominance) separation
- Chrominance processor
- Luminance processor
- Clock/timing processor
- A/D converters for Y/C
- Output formatter
- Host communication interface

== Process ==
Video decoding involves several processing steps. First the analog signal is digitized by an analog-to-digital converter to produce a raw, digital data stream. In the case of composite video, the luminance and chrominance are then separated; this is not necessary for S-Video sources. Next, the chrominance is demodulated to produce color difference video data. At this point, the data may be modified so as to adjust brightness, contrast, saturation and hue. Finally, the data is transformed by a color space converter to generate data in conformance with any of several color space standards, such as RGB and YCbCr. Together, these steps constitute video decoding because they "decode" an analog video format such as NTSC or PAL.
