= IVC videotape format =

Analog recording format developed by the International Video Corporation

IVC videotape
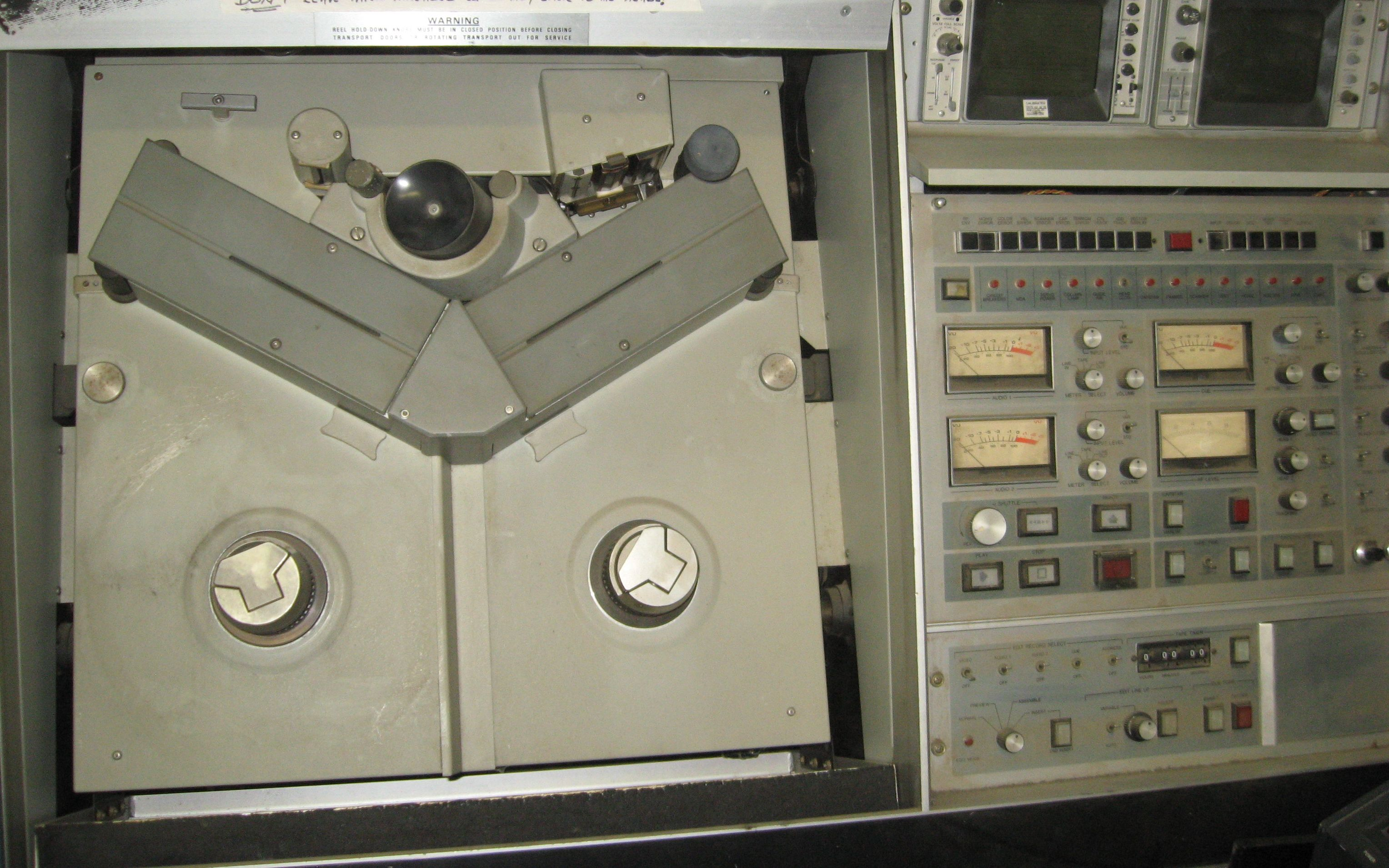
- IVC-9000 VTR at DC Video
- Media type: Magnetic tape
- Encoding: NTSC, PAL
- Standard: Interlaced video
- Developed by: International Video Corporation
- Usage: Video production
- Released: 1975

IVC 2-inch Helical scan was a high-end, broadcast quality helical scan analog recording format developed by the International Video Corporation (IVC) and introduced in 1975. Prior to this, IVC had produced several 1-inch (25 mm) helical scan video tape recorders (VTRs). Seeking to combine the image quality of the 2-inch (51 mm) magnetic tape used with quadruplex videotape systems, with the advantages of helical scan technology, the company developed the IVC-9000, a VTR for professional and broadcast applications.

== Versions ==
- IVC made the Model 9000 in five versions
- ionlamb.us IVC VTR list
  - IVC 9000 (NTSC and PAL unit, could record for 2 hours on one 10.5 inch reel)
  - IVC 9000-4 (4 ips tape speed, Long Play, could record and play back 4 hours on one 10.5 inch reel
  - IVC 9000-W (8 MHz record and playback for super bandwidth)
  - IVC 9000-M (could record and playback video in the 655-line/48 field per second (24 frame/s) video standard)
  - IVC 9000-W-M (An IVC 9000-M with options from the 9000-W added to it, enabling both 8 MHz wideband video recording and 655/48 capability)

The Helical scanner used a tape wrap of 188.57 degrees around a drum of 3.170 inches in diameter, with two play/record heads. In the NTSC version of the format, it had 5 helical tracks (segments) per field and 6 in the PAL version, each with 57 lines per segment. The VTR was equipped with a color video monitor, a waveform monitor scope, and vectorscope.

- All models had:
  - Two analog audio channels
  - One cue track
  - One control track
  - Time code track
  - Capstan-driven tape speed of 8 inches per second (10.5 inch reels)
  - Analog color timebase corrector (TBC)
  - Dropout compensation (a system that replaced snowy video spots (dropouts) where the FM signal on the video tape is missing momentarily, caused by a defect in the tape)
- Other Spec:
  - Vacuum tape tension columns
  - Vacuum grip capstan
  - Weight of 1,300 pounds (590 kg)
  - Power feed of 230 V at 3000 watts
  - One second lock up time, stop to play
  - a 1500-hour head warranty (for the 9000-4 models, a 3000-hour warranty)
  - Signal-to-noise ratio > 48 dB

The 9000 was one of the first analog video recorders utilized for electronic film production using analog high-resolution wideband video standards (such as the 655/48 standard mentioned previously), predating DI (digital intermediate) film production systems in use today.

The 9000-W-M was, for all intents and purposes, a custom pre-HDTV video system. The 655 line system was also used for 24 frame playback on TVs and monitors used on movie studio sets. Thus the TVs had no flicker when shot on film, due to the different (and thus compatible to motion picture film's) frame rate. The 9000-W-M was used for some JAWS 3D's composite special effects.

The 9000, in its regular 525-line and 60-field-per-second NTSC configuration, was also used for mastering some of the first LaserDiscs released by Discovision in 1978 due to the format's high quality. However, Discovision abandoned the format a few years later in favor of 1" Type C videotape, due to service and support for the 9000 machines becoming unavailable after IVC went out of business in the early 80s, and also due to the growing industry support for the newer 1" Type C format.

The picture quality was excellent, but the IVC-9000 did not have many sales (only 65 units were sold by IVC). Shortly after it came out, both the 1" Type B and 1" Type C formats of VTR came out. Both used less costly tape, and made just about as good of a picture.

- Ampex in 1961 made a 2 inch helical scan VTR for a short time, the VR-8000. They also produced another 2" helical VTR, the VR-660, in 1963.
- Sony also made a 2 inch Helical scan VTR, but it was non-segmented and they sold even fewer of them (in the early 1970s).

== IVC 800 series 1 Inch VTR ==
IVC 800 series 1 Inch VTR was very popular. 800 series are reel-to-reel helical 'mid band' color portable TVR using 1 inch/25mm tape running at 17.2 cm/s (6.77 in/s).

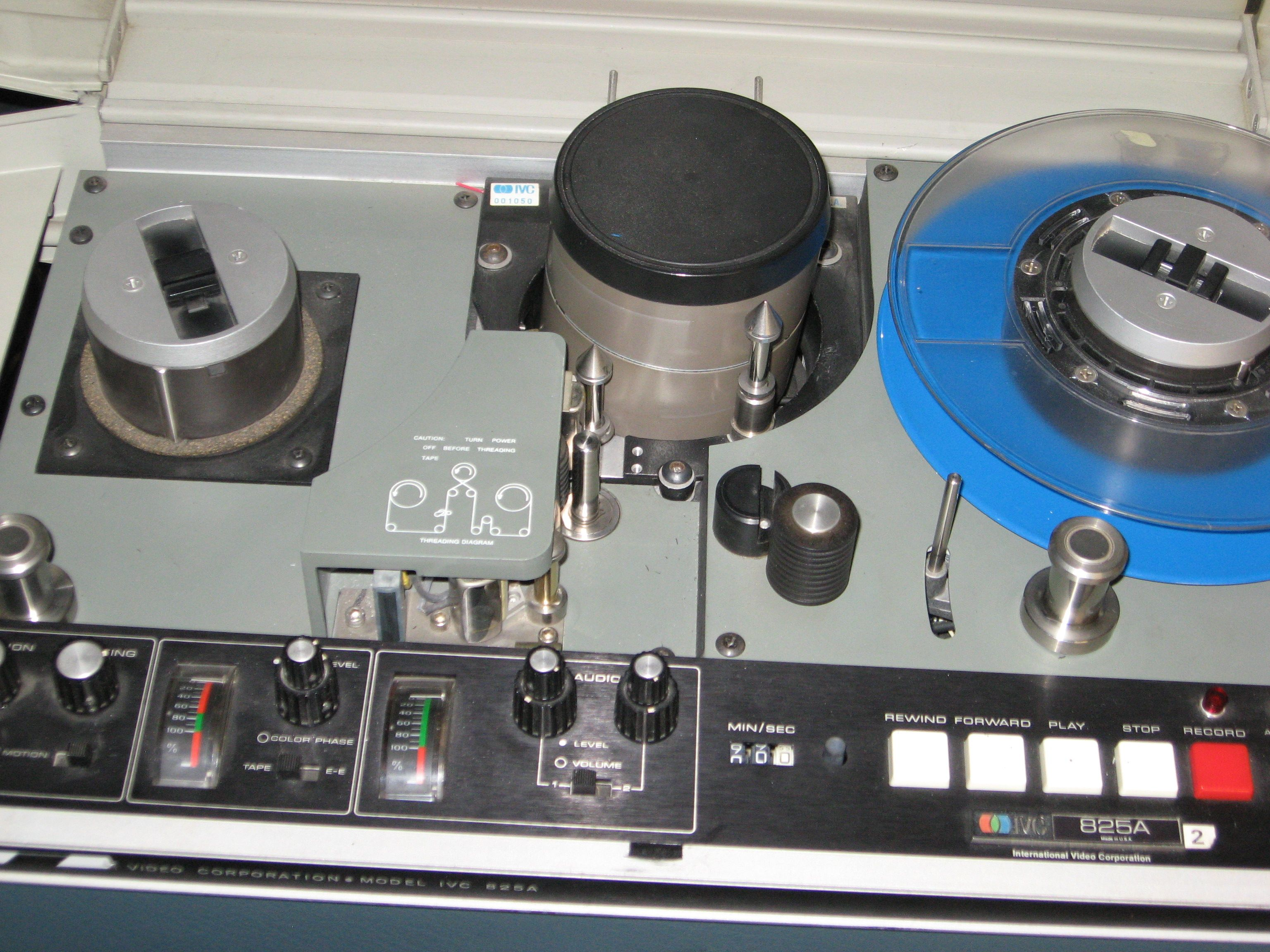
IVC 825A at DC Video

== See also ==
- 1 inch type B videotape
- 1 inch type C videotape
- 2 inch Quadruplex videotape
- Helical scan
- Videotape
- VTR
