= Michael Bielický =

Czech-German media artist and professor

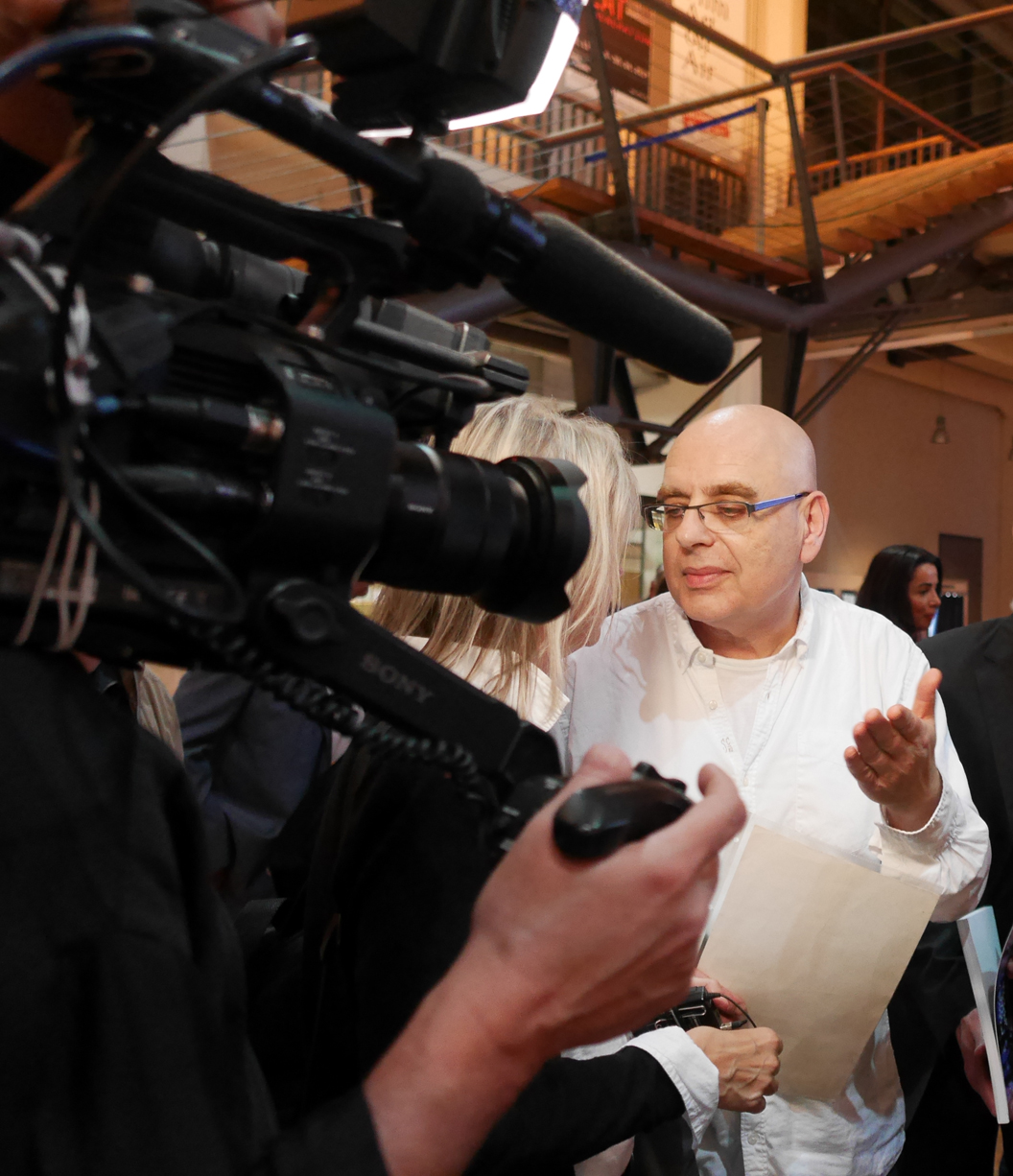
- Born: 12 January 1954; Prague
- Education: Academy of Fine Arts Prague, Kunstakademie Düsseldorf
- Known for: New media art, Video art, performance, installation art

Michael Bielicky (born 12 January 1954 in Prague) is a Czech-German artist working in new media, video art, and installations. He is a professor in the department of digital media and post-digital narratives at the Karlsruhe University of Arts and Design. In 1989, Bielicky's artwork Menora/Inventur became his first work to be acquired by the ZKM Center for Art and Media Karlsruhe by its founder Heinrich Klotz.

== Early life ==
Michael Bielicky spent his childhood in Czechoslovakia and emigrated with his parents to Düsseldorf, Germany in 1969. He studied medicine from 1975 to 1978. He lived in New York from 1980 to 1981 and experimented with photography there. Michael Bielicky returned to Germany in 1981 and worked for Monochrome Magazine from 1981 to 1989. He studied at the Kunstakademie Düsseldorf from 1984 to 1989, initially with Bernd Becher, and soon changed disciplines to study with Nam June Paik. He graduated in 1989 and worked as Paik's assistant until 1991.

== Life ==
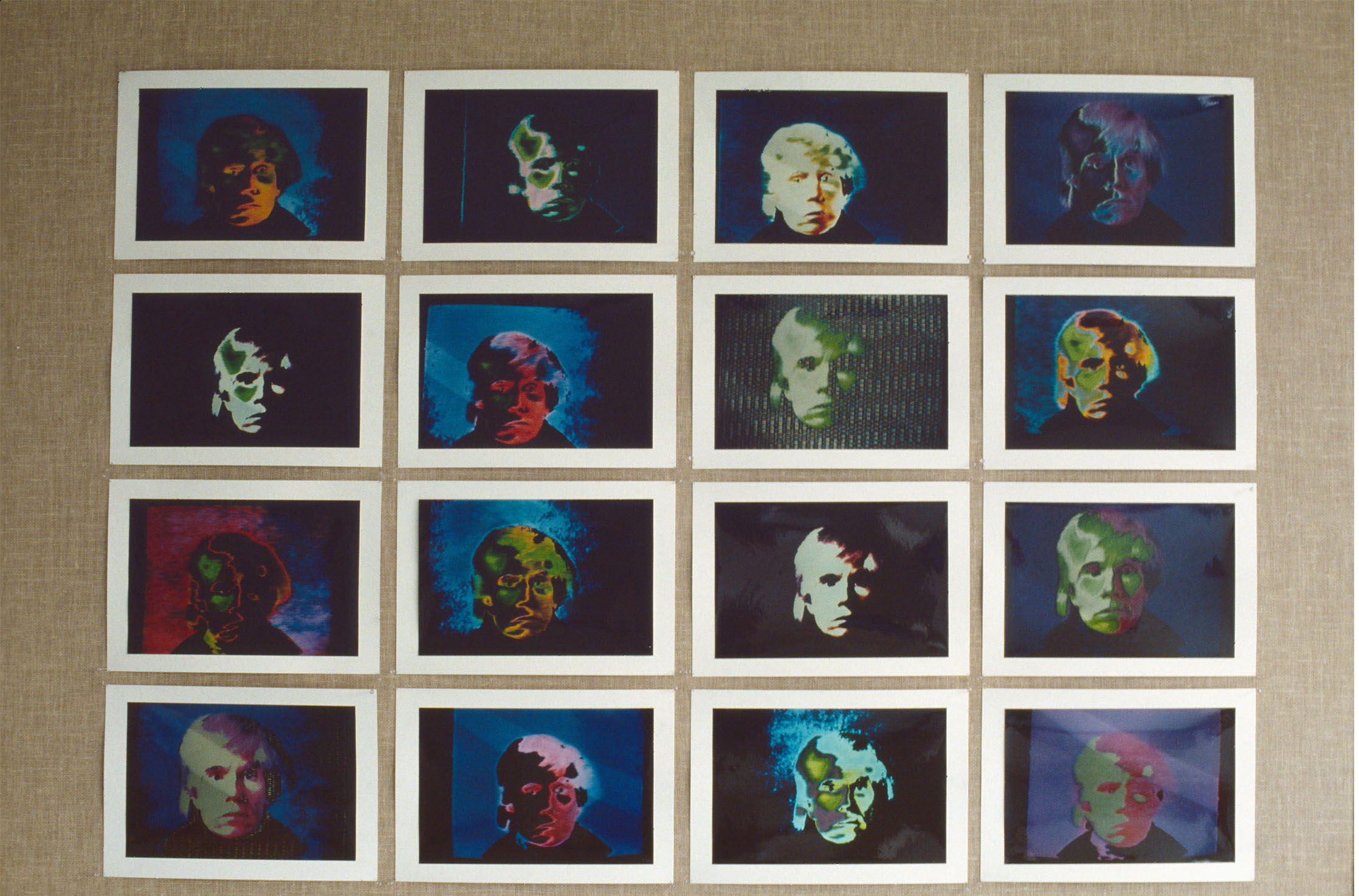
Digital Andy, photographic prints, 30x40cm each, 16 pieces. Recorded Warhol footage, distorted by unintended use of correction tools like Drop-out Compensators and Time Base Correctors, again photographed and printed

Bielicky was appointed professor of the Ateliér nových médií (New Media Department) at the Akademie výtvarných umění v Praze (AVU, Visual Arts University, Prague) in 1991, and served in that position until 2006. While at AVU, he collaborated with the Goethe Institute Prague and organized several symposia about Vilém Flusser. Since 1991, he also heads established various Media Art departments throughout Eastern Europe as a Soros Center for the Arts (SCCA) representative.

From 1995 to 1996, he was a scientific consultant for culture and technology for the Council of Europe in Strasbourg and subsequently in 1996, was assigned co-founder of Unstable Thoughts in Kyiv, Ukraine. In 1997, Bielicky cooperated with the High Tech Center Babelsberg in Potsdam.

Since the mid-1990s, he has been developing interactive installations and performances. From 1999 to 2001, he developed the Virtual Set Project at ZKM, and since 2002, he has been involved in establishing the first New Media Department at Chiang Mai University in Northern Thailand.

Since 2006, Bielicky has been a professor of Digital Media at the Staatliche Hochschule für Gestaltung Karlsruhe and has collaborated with Kamila B. Richter. They have worked on four technically linked groups of works: the Falling group (2005–2010), the Columbus 2.0 (2008–2011), Data Dybukk group (2015–2018), and the newest work Narcissistic Machine (2018), which is the initial work of a new group of works and marks a new technical and aesthetic programming onset.

== Works: In Between Video and Media Installations ==
Produced in 1986, Perpetuum Mobile was one of Michael Bielicky's first video works produced in Düsseldorf. Bielicky tried to reinvent his artistic practice along major technical cornerstones, starting with Stop Motion, via U-Matic, Time base correction with DOC (Drop-out compensator) to GPS, the Internet, and real-time data and provoked and documented the aesthetic errors of the specter in the machine, in parallel and in contradiction to the ongoing technical refinement process of the media industry.

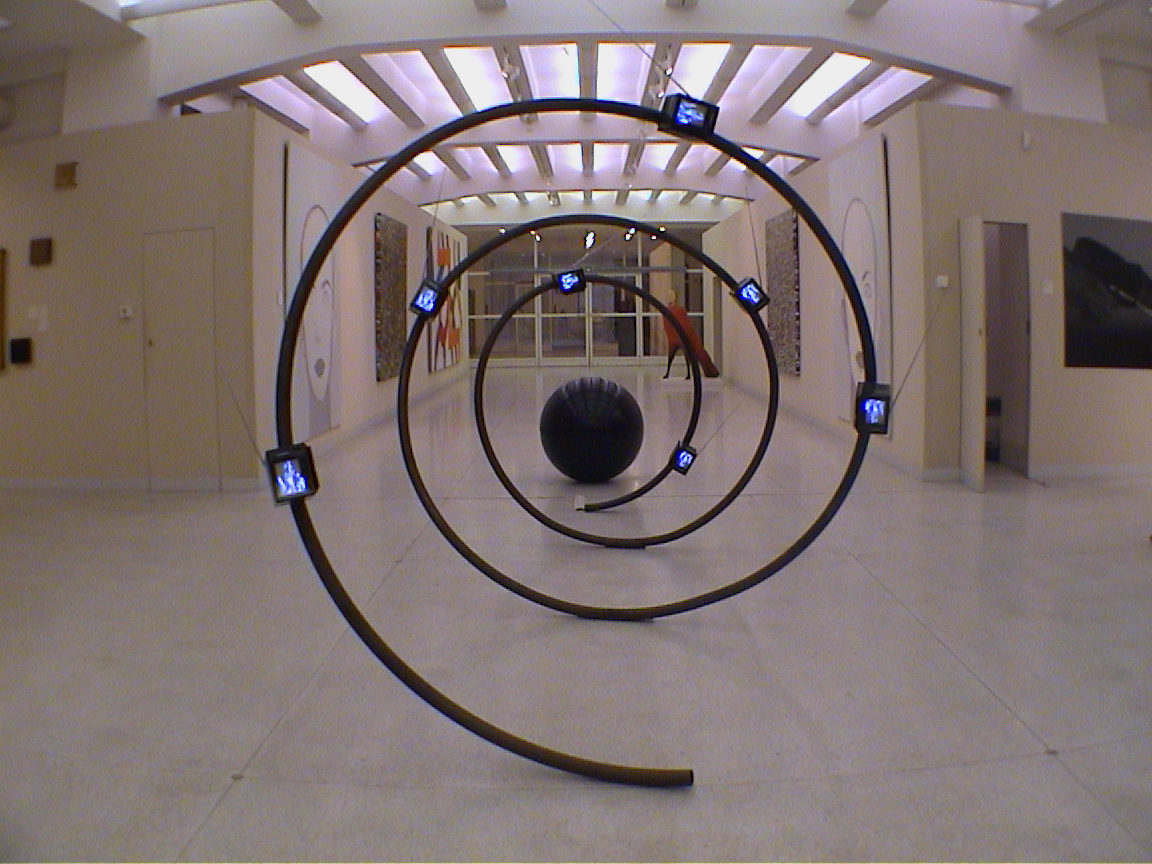
The Name, National Gallery Prague. The installation consists of a metal spiral (250 x 400 cm) with seven black and white televisions attached to it. It is possible to walk through the spiral like through a tunnel. At the end of the tunnel is the "somewhere," a black sphere equipped with a small television broadcast system, which transmits information - here in the form of a flame - to the televisions and the spiral.

In the 1980s he developed unintended techniques with the first digital video editing machines to alter, distort and rearrange his video material, akin to his mentor Nam June Paik's debut exhibition in 1963, where Paik used magnets to distort his own television-set-based exhibits. Works like Four Seasons (1984), Circulus Vicious (1985), and Paik-Hat (1986) are disturbing linear narrative traditions through cutting techniques and stop motion alone, whereas Perpetuum Mobile (1986), Next Year in Jerusalem (1988) and Golem is Alive (1989) introduce digital editing techniques to create videos, that appear to be haunted by the specters of early East European media culture. In 1989, the same year Golem is Alive is released, Michael Bielicky expands the two-dimensional screen into the exhibition space. With his Menorah/Inventur (1989) he does away with the screen frames with the intent to dissolve those in a symbolically powerful sculpture, one of the main symbols of the Jewish religion. One year later, in 1990, he does away with the religious symbolism and houses his videos in the most universal scientific and technical symbol, the spiral:

"One can walk through the spiral-like tunnel. At the end of that tunnel is a black sphere (somewhere). A small TV transmitter transmits the information (in the form of a flame) to the carrier, the spiral, and the receivers (TVs). Information always moves through time and space in the same form. It always has the form of a spiral. The sounds of human language move through space in the same way as our solar system moves through the universe. We store information on a computer disc in a spiral form, as we do on a videotape.

The Name (1990), which is technically akin to Menorah/Inventur (the small televisions are receivers for a video source nearby, fire and screens are intertwined as a symbol of and a means of communication), is the attempt to balance technical expertise and historic cultural mystery in one work of art. Bielicky tries to unmask technology as one Metanarrative among many.

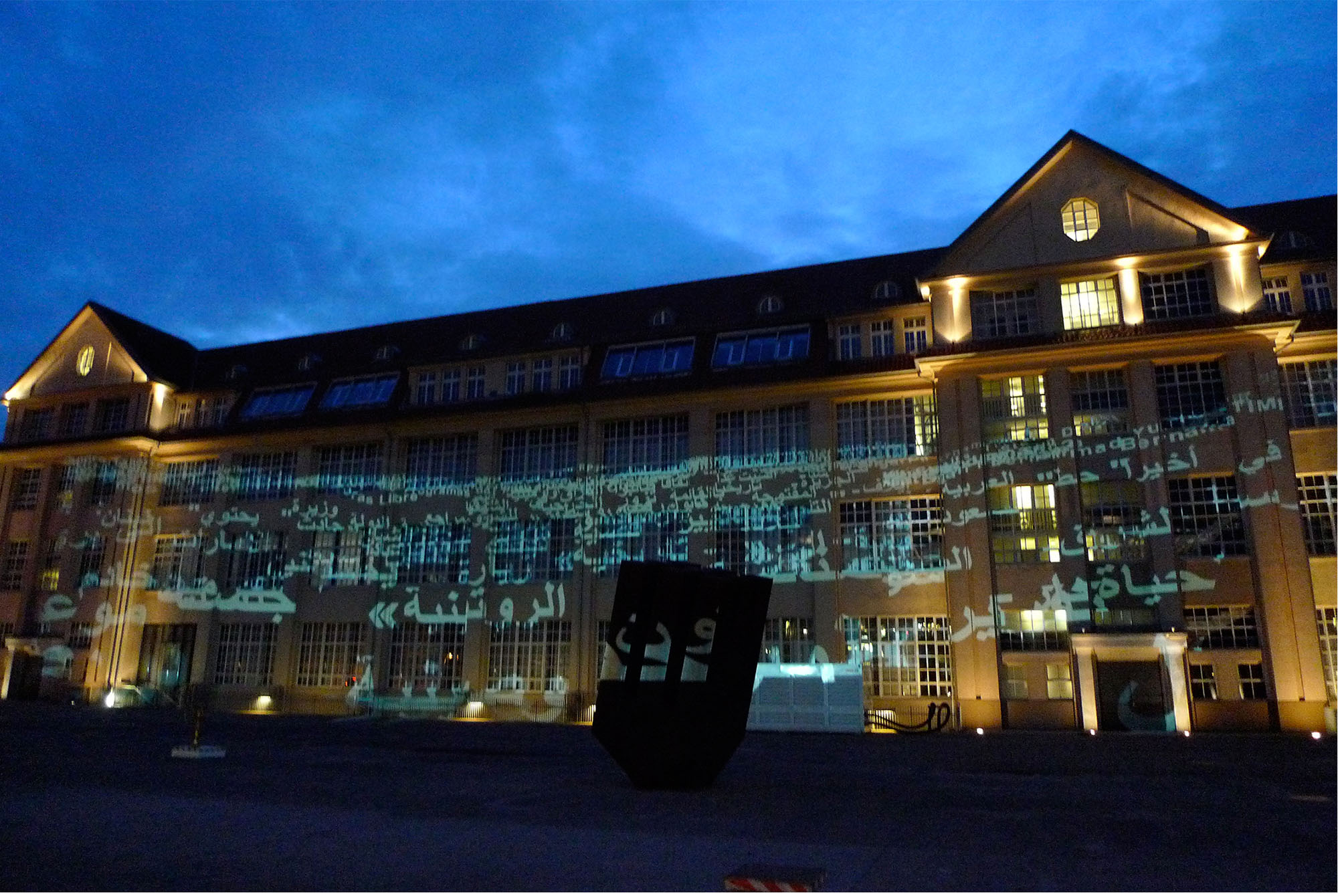
Columbus 2.0, interactive installation by Kamila B. Richter and Michael Bielicky (software, ship steering wheel, projectors), ZKM, Karlsruhe

In 1987 Bielicky examined the destruction of Joseph Beuys's Fettecke (Fat Corner) in collaboration with Ricardo Peredo Wende. The resulting documentary video sculpture is a who is who of Beuys's students and disciples, as well as a cascade of partly absurd, partly fascinating explanations, of why and how this case of a janitor's utter ignorance of art has implications for the future of art as a whole.

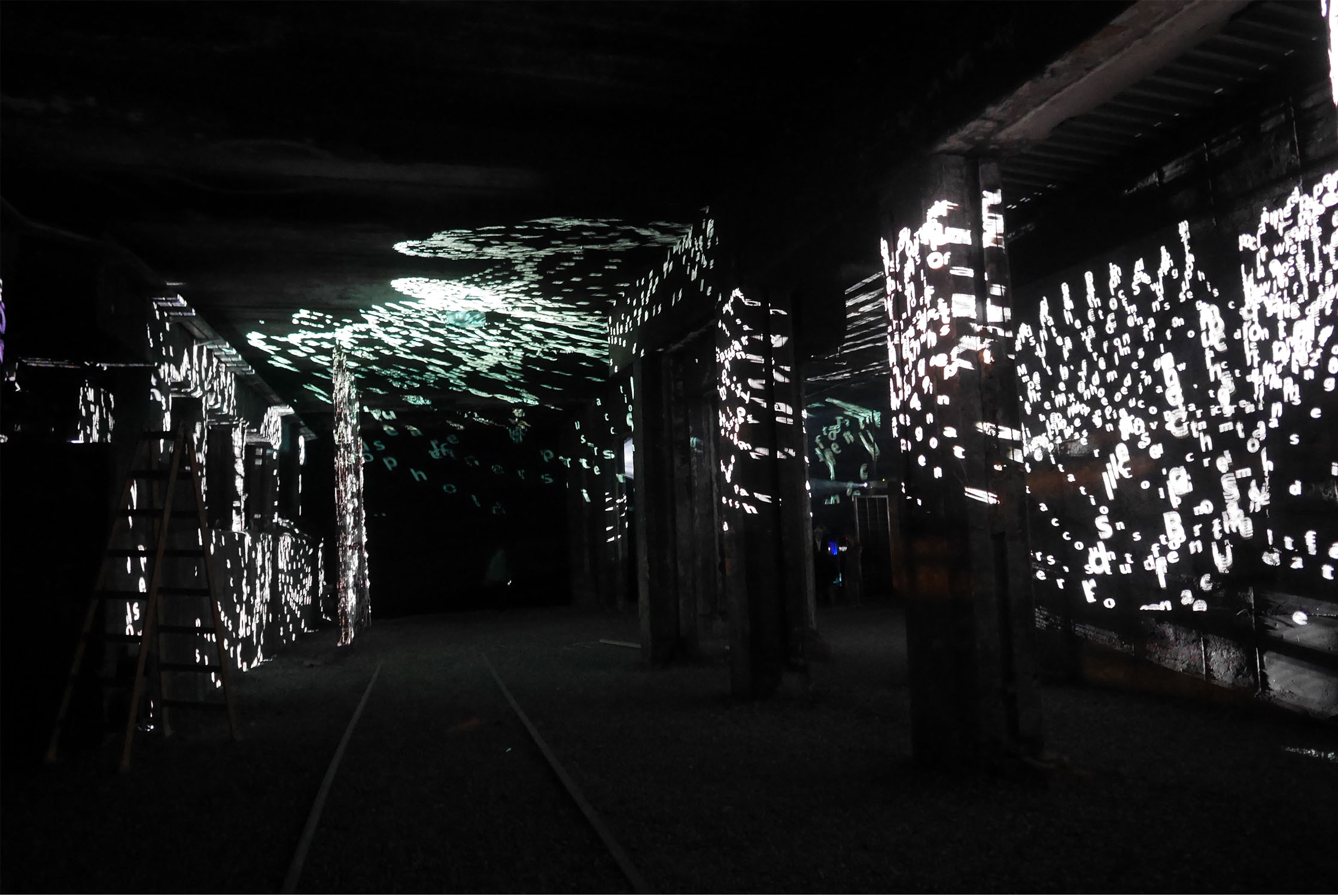
Data Steel, Colours of Ostrava. Software (Java), projectors, old iron mill

Bielicky aimed to inscribe the biblical Exodus route into the early framework of what would become the internet. Described as a teleperformance, Bielicky and collaborators equipped a Jeep with advanced technology of the period and tracked the Exodus route in the Negev desert, collecting GPS data and uploading it to one of the first websites. This project, situated at the intersection of religion and narrative technology, represents a pivotal moment in Bielicky's oeuvre. Technology is no longer shrouded in mystique; the balance established in The Name (1990) shifts toward technological agency, as Bielicky systematically traces the biblical history of Jewish culture through scientific means.

In 1994 he begins to experiment with GPS in an art context: his work Intelligent Mailman (1994) is the first of its kind worldwide and marks the onset of numerous foundational research projects on interactive media art (see: Works: Proceedings and Foundations).

Since 2005 - in cooperation with Kamila B. Richter - Bielicky develops web-based, often interactive projects, controlled by real-time data fed from the Internet. Market and stock exchange data, news, Twitter, and other data streams guide their animated stories - often in an uncanny and counterintuitive way. This workshop series can be described by four major setups: The earliest two web-based projects with Kamila B. Richter are Columbus 2.0 and Falling Life/Times (with a predecessor called Falling Stars). Columbus 2.0 was displayed in Wuhan (2007), Sevilla (2008), and Thessaloniki (2011), whereas Falling Life/Times was displayed in Barcelona (2007), São Paulo (2008), and New York (2008).

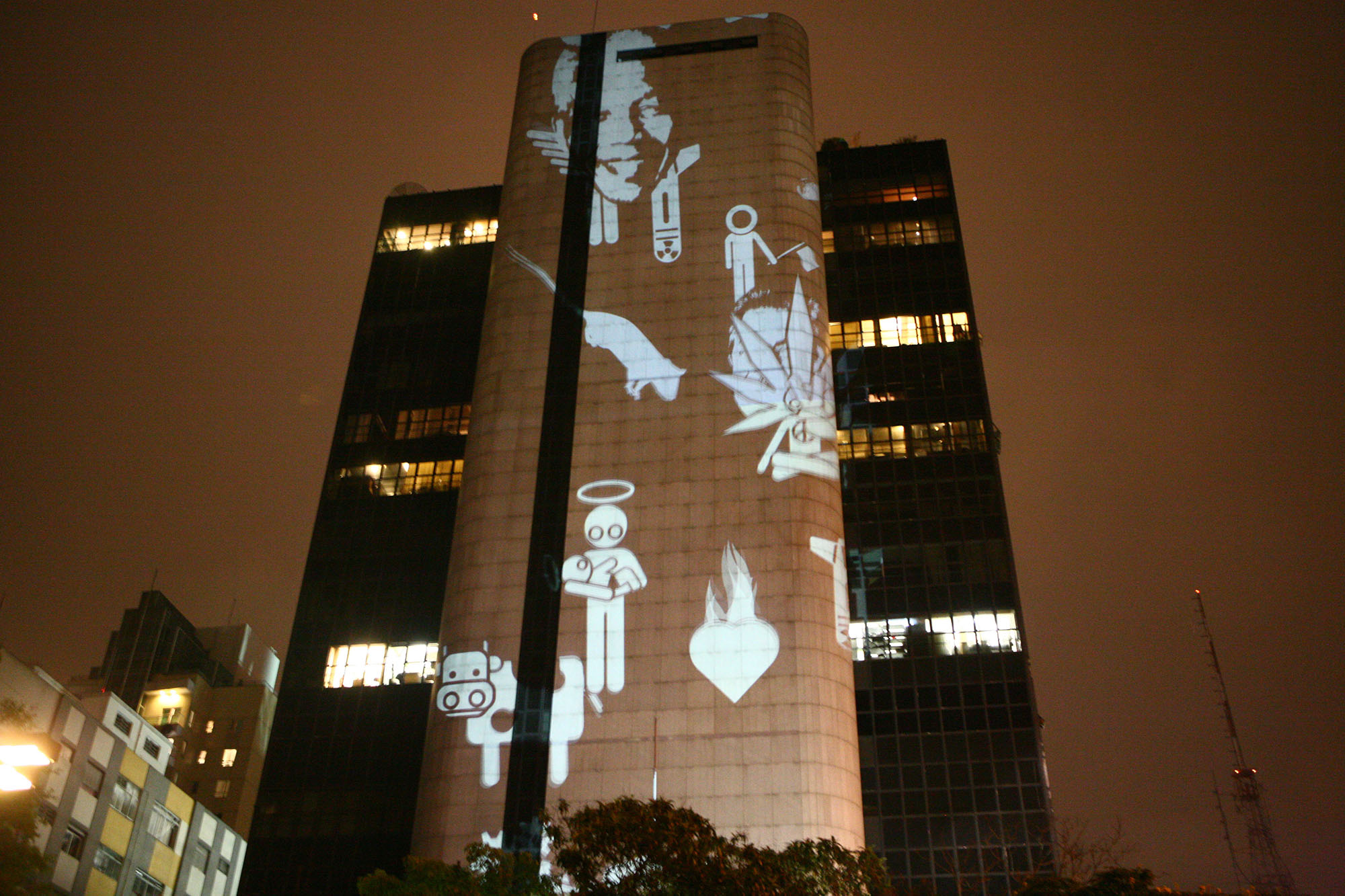
Falling Times, Go Public Avenida Paulista, São Paulo. Software (Flash), projectors, skyscraper

The more complex, later two web-based projects with Kamila B. Richter is The Garden of Error and Decay and the Why Don't We series. The Garden of Error and Decay series takes the text-to-pictogram-converter-algorithms of Falling Times and accompanies its generated pictograms with the texts that generated them on screen - in a Garden Eden kind of backdrop. Adding the wave-animations of Columbus 2.0 and its interactive approach, the Garden of Error and Decay series engulfs the exhibition visitor in an information environment occupied by skeletons, warlords, and explosions, with the option to stop ("shoot") a pictogram with the joystick mounted in front of the projection: a desperate attempt to lessen its impact on the world of information (it is displayed smaller if successfully hit). Nevertheless, there is a meta-information feed overriding all the mentioned interaction and aggregation algorithms at work. This meta-information feed is that of the NY stock exchange and influences the dimensions the messages and pictograms are displayed in a far greater way, to a point where the interaction of the visitor does not count at all. The Garden of Error and Decay was displayed in Wuhan (2009), Moscow (2011), Vienna (2011), Vienna (2012), Seoul (2013), and Karlsruhe (2013).

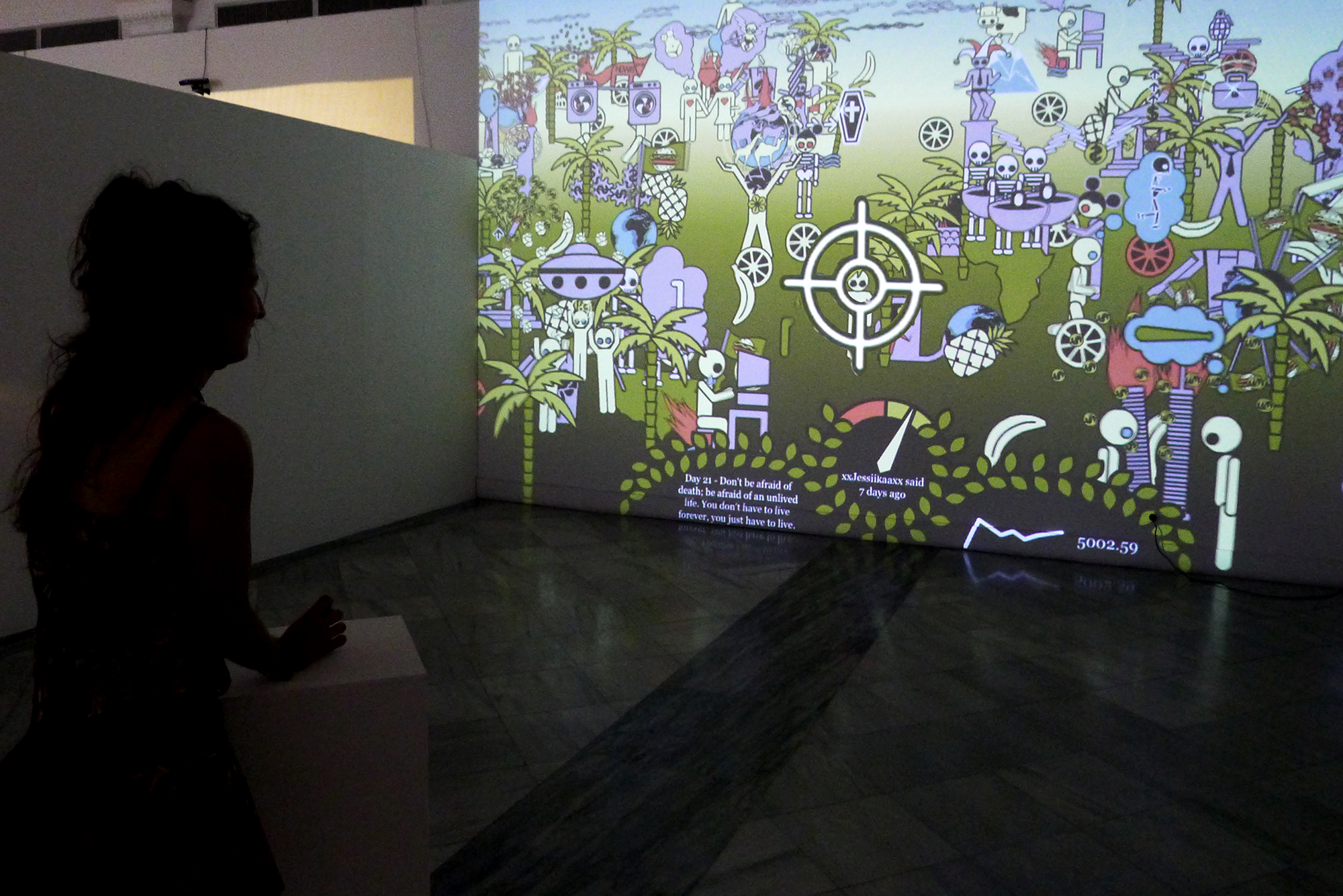
Garden of Error and Decay (joystick, software (Flash), projectors), interactive installation, driven by Twitter and Stock Exchange Data

The Why Don't We series takes a slightly different approach to web-influenced narratives. The narrative is not endless and pluralistic, displaying many social media messages in parallel, but picks one message, displays it for the visitor to see, and tells a short story in automatically generated pictograms until the next digital (news) text is displayed and the next narrative is visualized. Why Don't We were displayed in Vienna (2013), Berlin (2013), and Bad Rothenfelde (2014, 2017).

In 2015 Michael Bielicky and Kamila B. Richter used their narration algorithms to project a self-similar, compartmentalized, endless, dense, and orchestra-controlled narrative of pictograms which not only uncannily felt at home on the scanaefrons, behind the theatre stage, but even were the only protagonist and pivotal part of the piece. Appropriately called Lost Objects the Opera was displayed at the National Theatre Prague.

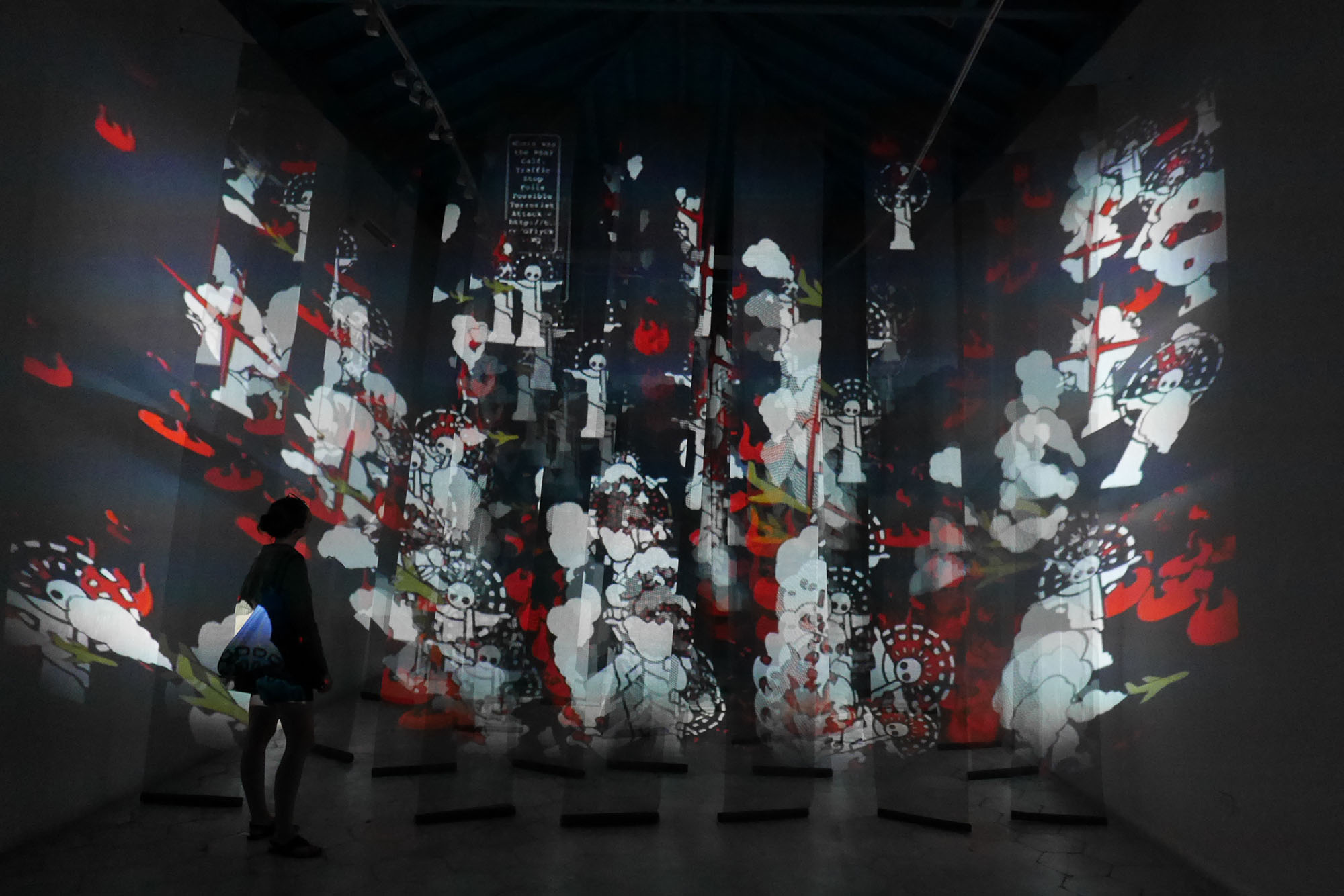
Lost (Version), extract of the Opera Lost Objects, Centro Contemporameo Wifredo Lam, Havana. Software (Flash), projectors, translucent panels

Michael Bielicky and Kamila B. Richter had solo exhibits at Strasbourg (2016) and Havana (2017). Stemming from the Lost Objects experience in the Opera House, all four series brought together in a visitor-controlled manner. The visitors are made to feel like the protagonists as they stride through the cut-up, translucent, and three-dimensionally hung projection canvases over covered pictograms and texts.

== Works: Proceedings and Foundations ==
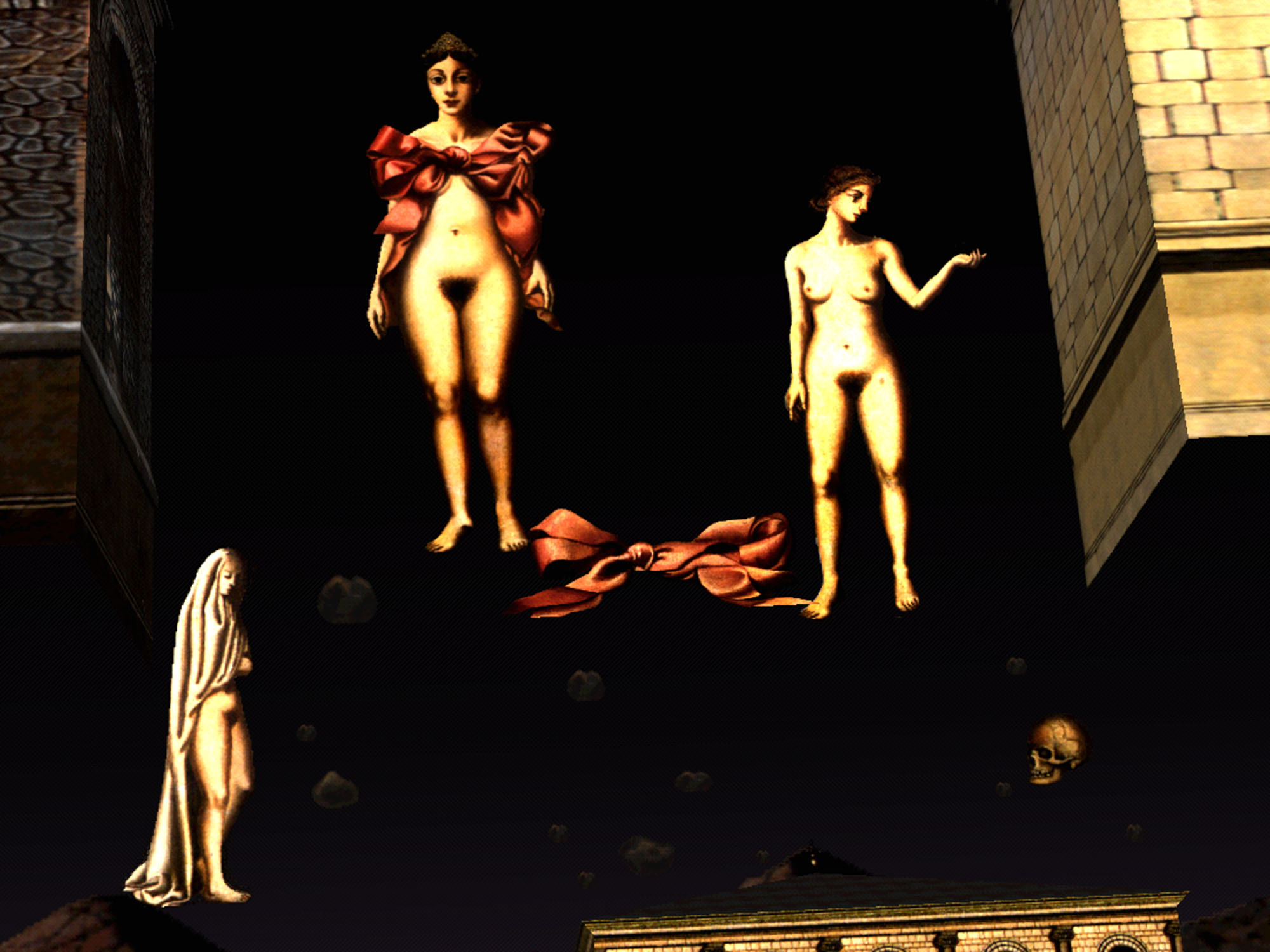
Delvaux's Dream, ZKM Karlsruhe. Delvaux's Dream is about the universal human dream of wandering through paintings and ultimately through photographs and moving images. Delvaux's Dream displays the world of Belgian artist Paul Delvaux. Reconstructed with the help of the chroma key technology and a complex tracking interpreter system, the painting becomes accessible.

Bielicky returns to Prague from 1991 to 2006 to found the School of Media Arts at the Academy of Fine Arts (AVU). In addition to his AVU position, he works closely with the Goethe Institute Prague and – beginning in the early 1990s - organizes several symposia in honor of the famous, also Prague-born philosopher and photography theoretician Vilém Flusser. He has been an advisor in culture and technology to the Soros Centre for Contemporary Art through Eastern Europe from Bucharest, Odesa, and Moscow to Alma-Ata in Kazakhstan, to the Council of Europe in Strasbourg, and to Chiang Mai University in Thailand where he is involved in establishing a new Media Arts Department. From the mid-1990s on, Bielicky leads foundational research programs at the ZKM Centre for Art and Media in Karlsruhe: an interactive 360° environment, named Delvaux's Dream (1998–99), and a project for Volkswagen in the Autostadt Wolfsburg named Room with a View (2000). In 1996 he has been the co-founder of the Institute of Unstable Thoughts in Kyiv, Ukraine. Michael Bielicky cooperates with the High Tech Centre Babelsberg in Potsdam in 1997. From 1999 to 2000 Bielicky establishes a research program on interactive 360° environment prototypes at the ZKM Centre for Art and Media in Karlsruhe, as well as - from 1999 to 2001 - the Virtual Set Project, which builds on the former.

From 2006 to 2023, Michael Bielicky has been Professor of New Media at the Karlsruhe University of Arts and Design.

== Exhibitions ==
Bielicky's first exhibition was held in 1988 at the Cité internationale des arts in Paris, in the grand glass front gallery reserved for scholars on the second floor. The first major retrospective of his works in collaboration with Kamila B. Richter was held at the Centro de Arte Contemporáneo Wifredo Lam in Havana, Cuba. The first major retrospective of his work is organized by the Centre of Media and Arts (ZKM) Karlsruhe and opens on 13 October 2019. It is scheduled to run until 8 March 2020.

In 1991, an exhibition centered on Bielicky's video sculpture The Name (1990) opened at the Montevideo Gallery in Amsterdam, Netherlands.

Bielicky's work also appeared in group exhibitions such as São Paulo Biennale (1987), Videonale (1988, 1990, 1992), Multimediale 2 (1991), Ars Electronica (1992, 1994, 1995), Global Contemporary (2011), Havana Biennale (2012) and Globale (2015).

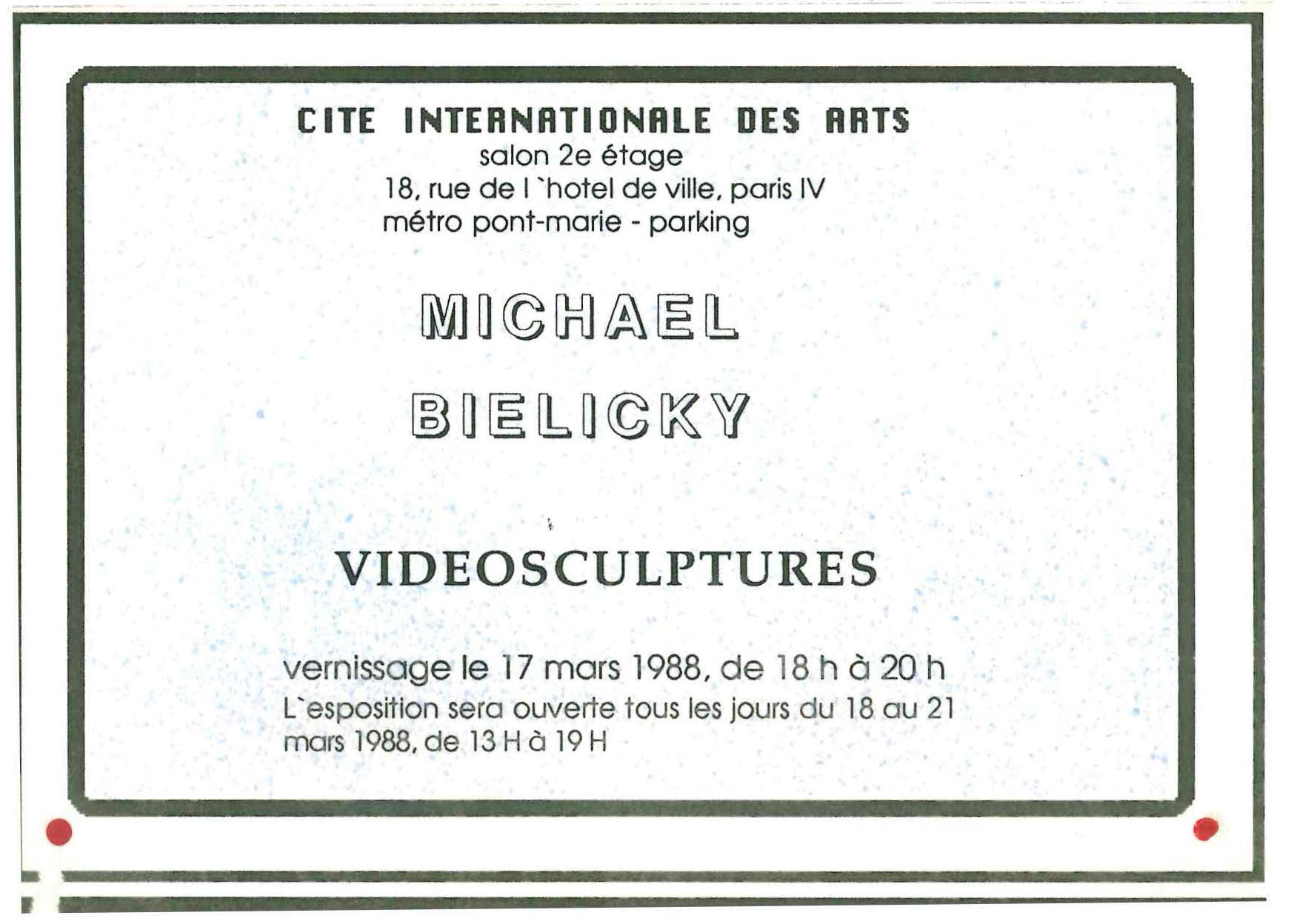
Flyer of the first solo exhibition by Michael Bielicky during a scholarship in Paris at the Cite Internationale des Arts in 1988

== Awards and scholarships (selection) ==
- 1988 Honorable mention 3. Marler Video-Kunst-Preises (3rd Marler Video-Art-Prize)
- 1988 scholarship for Cité Internationale des Arts de Paris, Paris
- 1999–2000: Guest artist grant at the Institute for Image Media (produced@) at the ZKM Karlsruhe
- 2000 Prix Ars Electronica, Honorable mention for Cyber Arts for Room With A View
