= Frame synchronization (video) =

Process of synchronizing display pixel scanning to a synchronization source

In video, frame synchronization is the process of synchronizing display pixel scanning to a synchronization source. When several systems are connected, a synchronization signal is fed from the synchronization source to the other systems in the network, and the video signals are synchronized with each other.

A sync generator produces a central timing reference (usually a color black signal, also known as a black and burst) that is distributed throughout a facility. The central timing reference is used in video production to synchronize the timing of a video source signals. As a result, the timing or alignment of the video frame can be adjusted so that the start of the upper left corner scan line of the image occurs simultaneously on all video equipment in the network. This is an absolute requirement for both analog and digital systems in order to perform video effects or glitch-free source switching.

== See also ==
- Genlock
- Time base corrector
