= Pulse-cross =

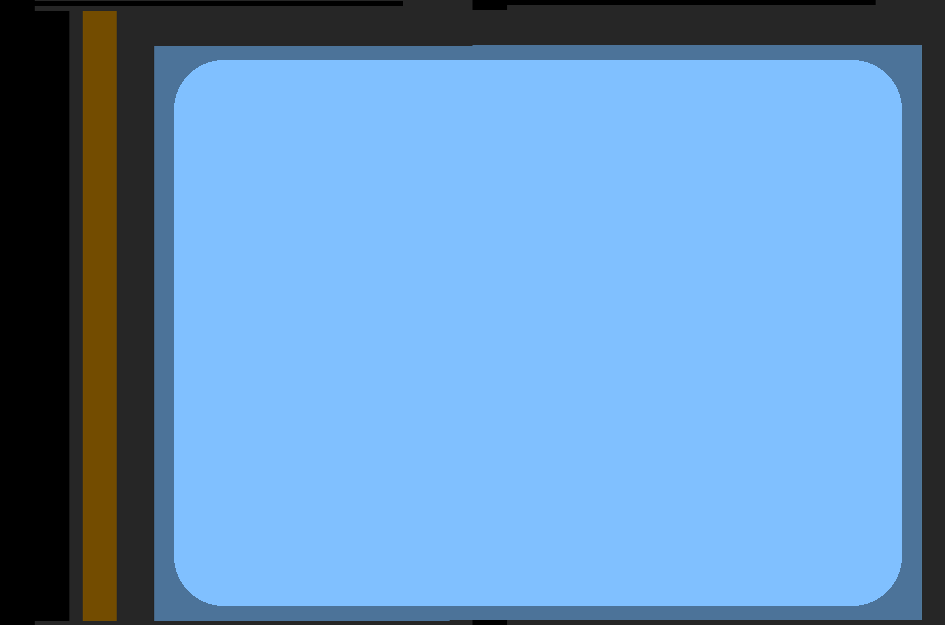
Not all parts of the video signal are displayed on the screen.

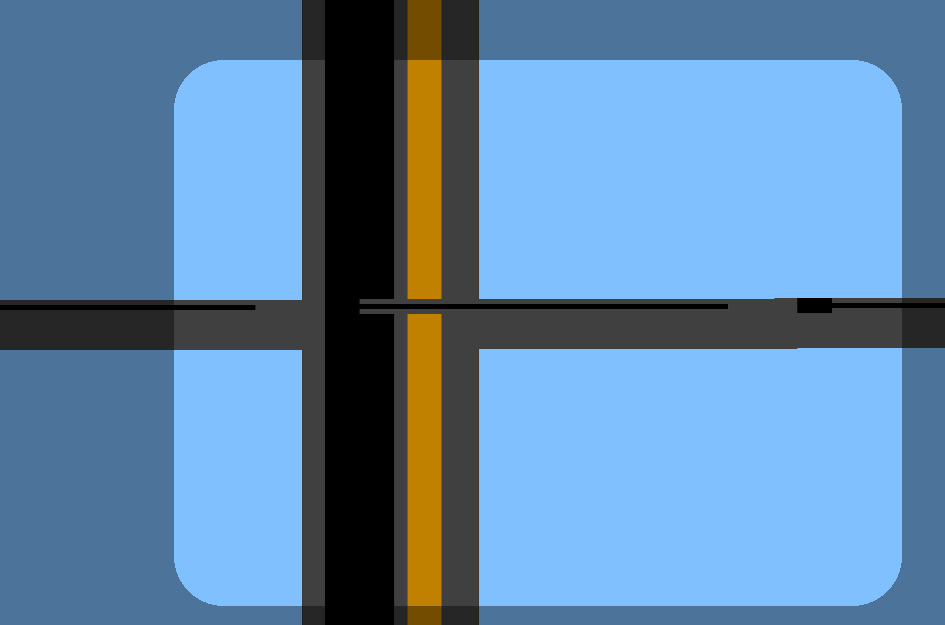
Through temporal shift, other areas are made visible.

A pulse-cross is the representation of normally invisible portions of an analog video signal on a studio screen for error analysis. During normal operation, parts of the video signal are not displayed and instead fall outside the normal viewing region of a screen. By offsetting the video signal, these additional parts become visible

Only part of an analog video signal contains image information: with a 625-line video signal, each field lasts 20 ms. Of these, only 18.4 ms (287.5 lines) are provided for image information; the remaining 1.6 ms (25 lines) form the vertical blanking interval, a time reserved for the vertical retrace of the electron beam. Likewise, of the 64 μs of each line, only 52 μs contain image information; the remaining 12 μs form the horizontal blanking interval for the horizontal retrace. These blanking intervals are thus outside the picture.

A pulse-cross circuit delays synchronization in the monitor, shifting the image to the left or up. This reveals areas of the video signal that are usually outside the image. In addition, the circuit reduces the contrast of the image, so that the sync pulses are also shown, where the voltage is below the black level.

In a standard-compliant video signal, the vertical synchronization signal consists of five long pulses of 59.3 μs duration and is framed by five 2.35 μs short pulses before and after, the pre-equalizing pulses. Home computers, game consoles, etc. often do not provide a standard-compliant signal: the sync signal contains no gaps and no pre-equalizing pulses. A pulse-cross circuit will reveal these inaccuracies.

For PAL color coding, the color burst signal can be seen in the form of an orange bar. For a pure black and white signal, the burst is missing.

Furthermore, the timing error of a video recorder can be recognized on the signal cross. Switching the video heads will cause a single line in the image to be either too long or too short. This error can be corrected by a time base corrector.

== Literature ==
- Ru van Wezel, Video-Handbuch (German language)
- Martin Hinner, PAL video timing specification
