= Bi-Level =

Bi-level may refer to:

- Mullet (haircut)
- Bilevel car, double-deck railway carriages
- Bi-level image
- Bi-level home
- Bi-level sync in Video
