= Kamila B. Richter =

Czech-German artist

Richter B. Kamila
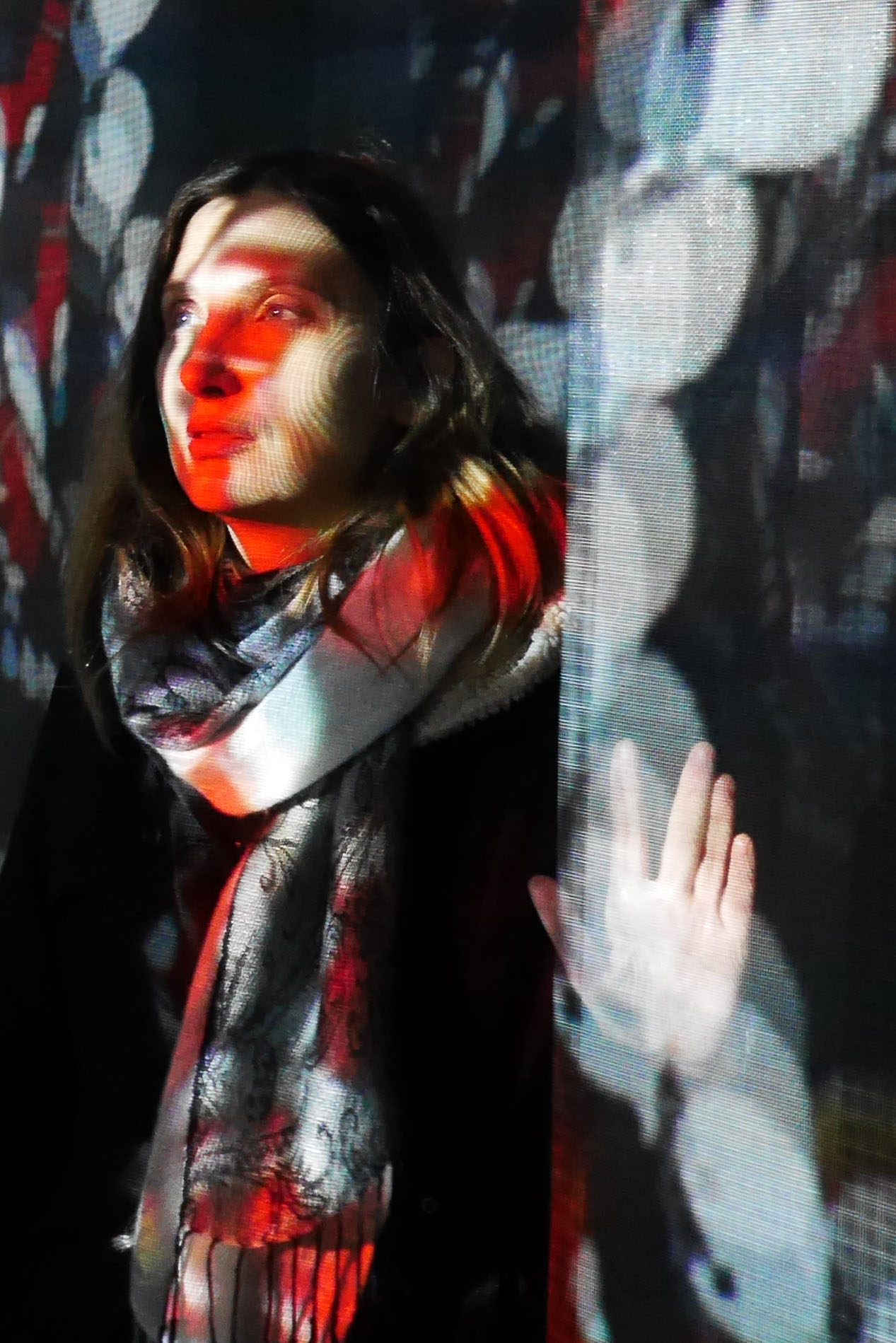
- Kamila B. Richter
- Born: 2 May 1976; Olomouc, Czech Republic
- Education: Academy of Fine Arts Prague, Technikon Natal
- Known for: New media art, Video art, performance, installation art, painter

Kamila B. Richter (born 1976) is a Czech media artist.

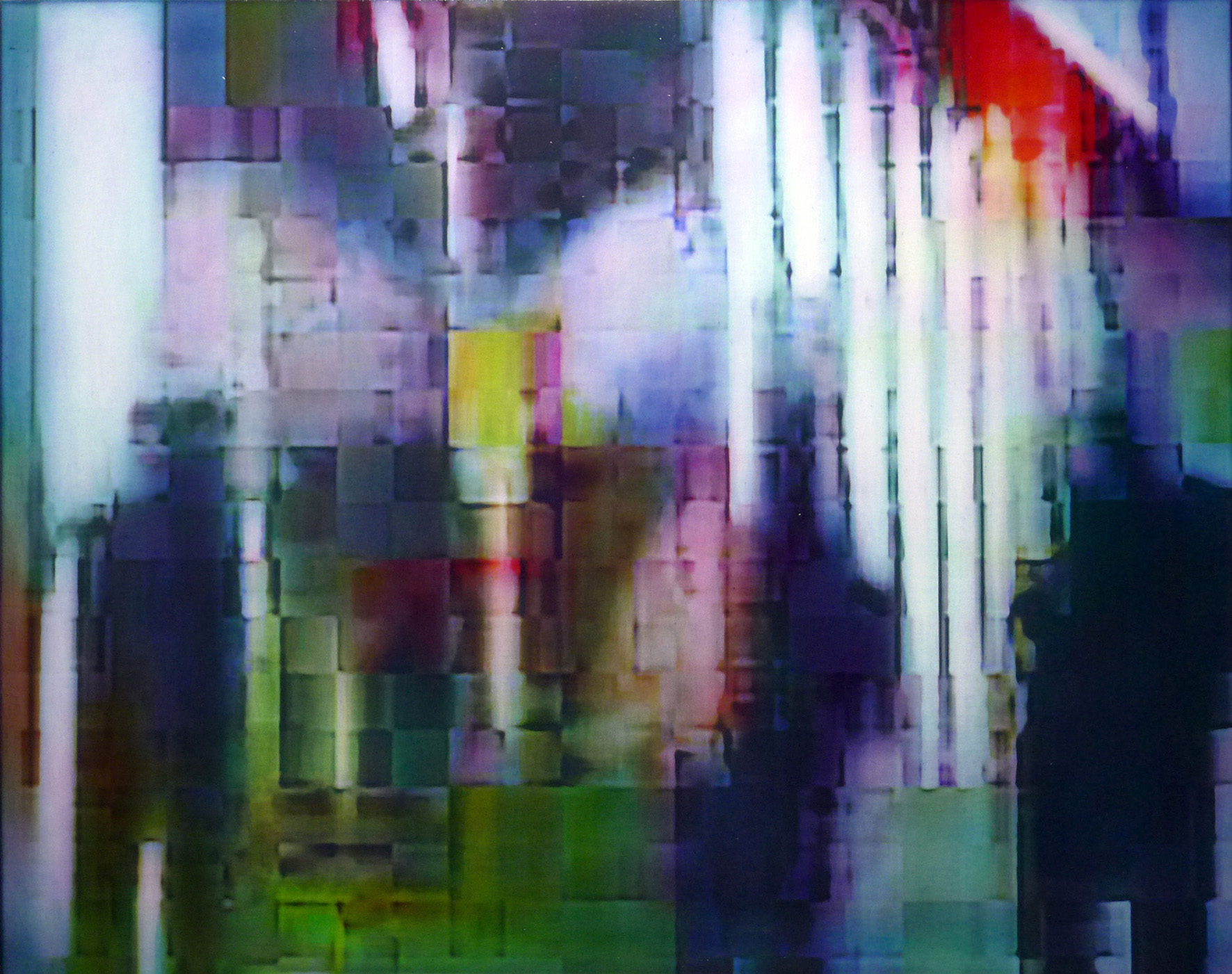
Kamila B. Richter - To Err is Machine, Tokyo III, 2018 (digital error, ink, oil, amber on canvas) (Cut) - Painting (Oil on Canvas).Technically out-dated mobile phones with low-resolution cameras were used to capture the nightlife on the streets of European, Asian, South- and North-American cities.

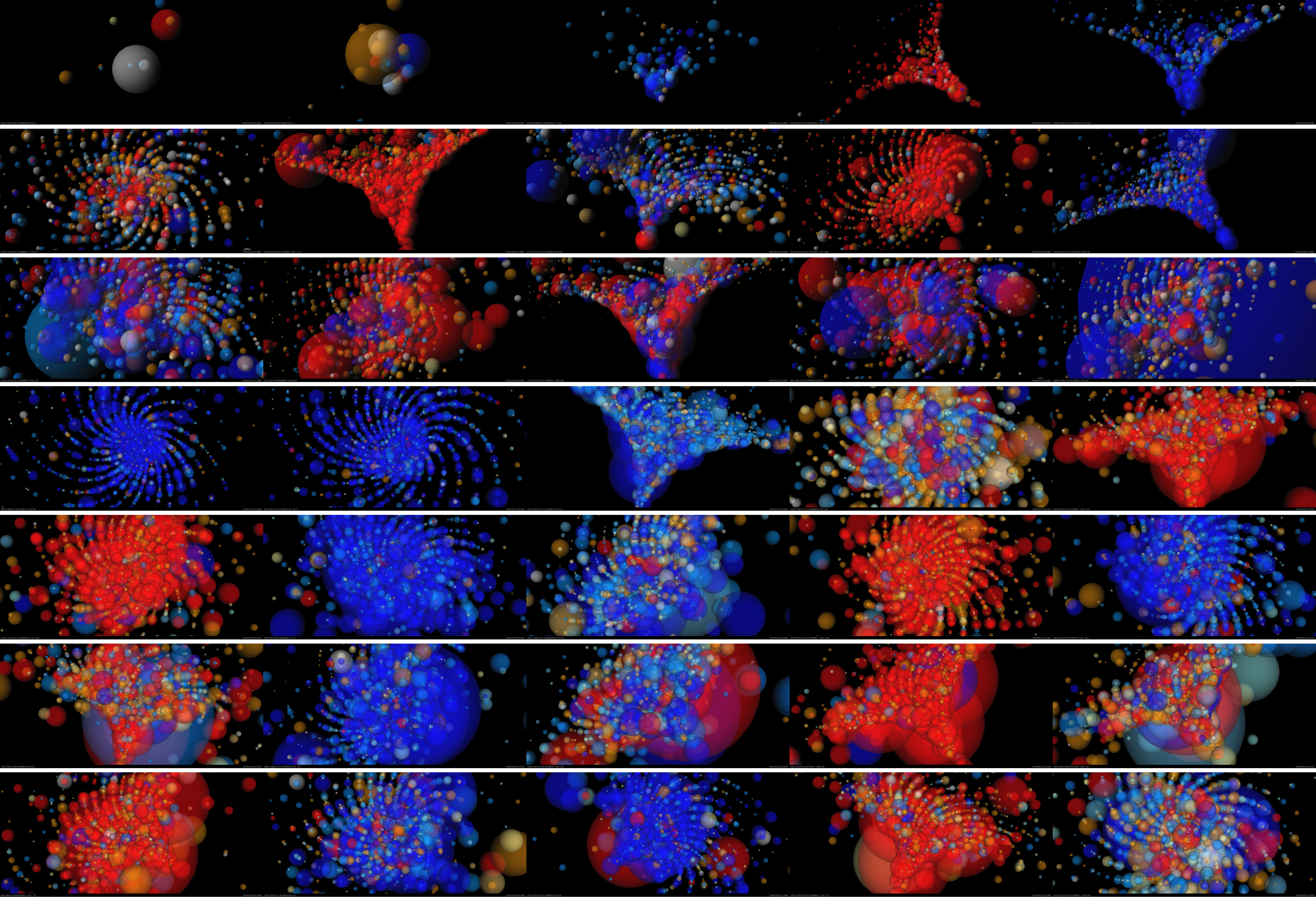
Kamila B. Richter - Emporium Spirit - Screen stills of data visualization artwork Emporium Spirit

== Education ==
From 2000 until 2002 Richter lived in South Africa and studied at the Technikon Natal, Durban, where she obtained her master's degree in 2001.

In 2010 Richter finished her Doctor of Philosophy at the Academy of Fine Arts in Prague.

== Career ==
Richter is interested in everything digitalized. For Richter, the camera’s blurred image is a proper reflection of reality. She combines mediatised reality with old master style oil painting technique, which she layers in weeklong work stages to finish her versions of mediatised streetscapes, materializing the tension of contemporary visual culture. Richter's work makes data streams and their actions visible (Emporium Spirit, New York Stock Exchange visualization, 2005, Black Vortex, Prague Stock Exchange visualization, 2006, and others).

Richter was a programmer of the early web era (0-System, web project reflecting the medium of the web, 1997 and M-System, participatory web game project, 1998).

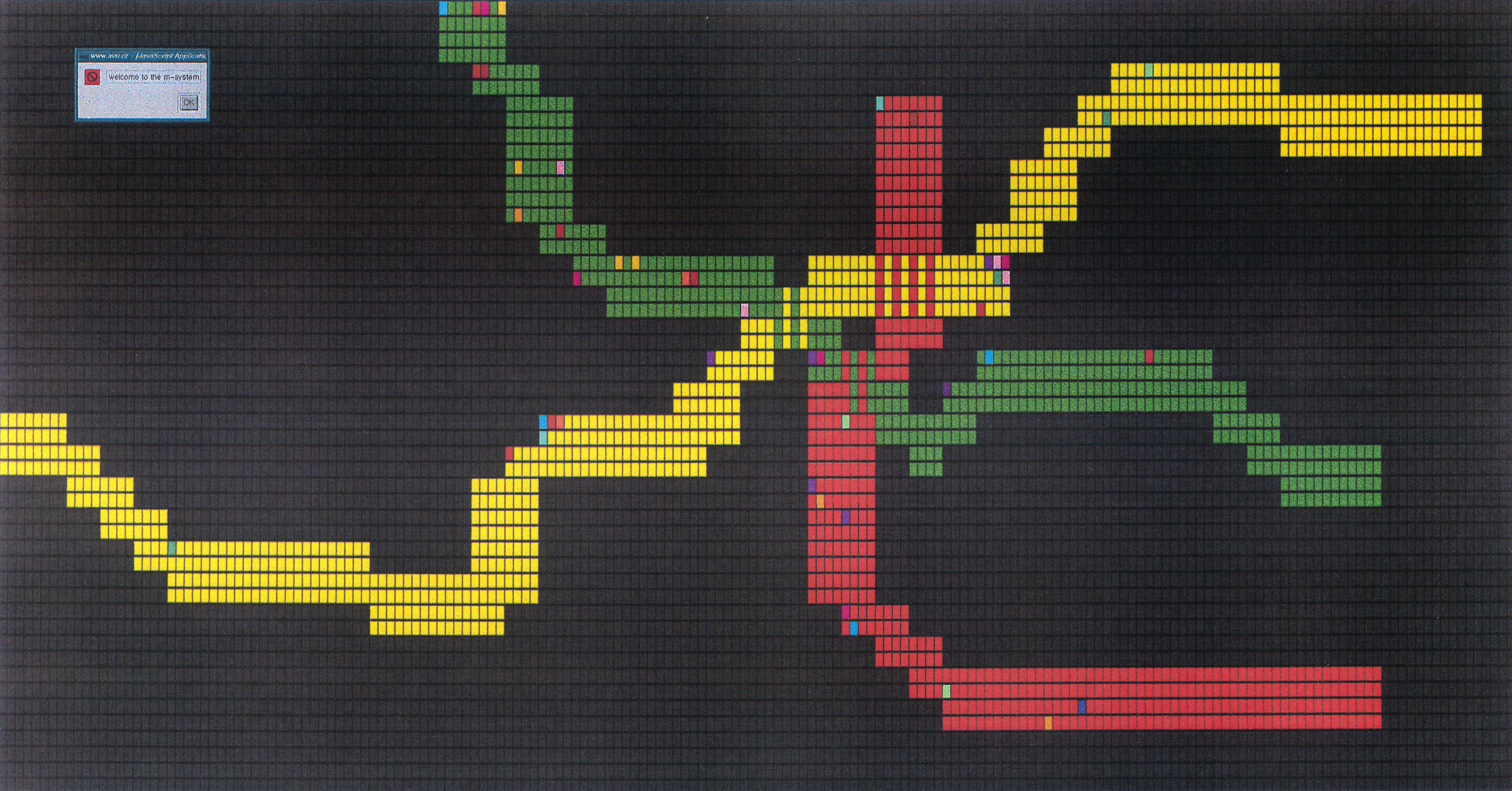
Kamila B. Richter - M-System. The participatory web project M-system offers a simple abstract reality of the Prague subway transportation system wherein an individual trace of participation can be entered to change the otherwise strict map of the subway net collectively..

Since 2005 – in cooperation with Michael Bielický – Richter has developed web-based, often interactive projects controlled by real-time data fed from the Internet. Usually, market and stock exchange data, news, twitter, and other data sources guide her animated stories. The projects include Lost Objects, National Theatre Prague (2015) and Lost, Apollonia, Strasbourg (2016). Their solo exhibition LOST (2017) at the Centro de Arte Contemporáneo Wifredo Lam in Havana, Cuba, ended after the second extension.

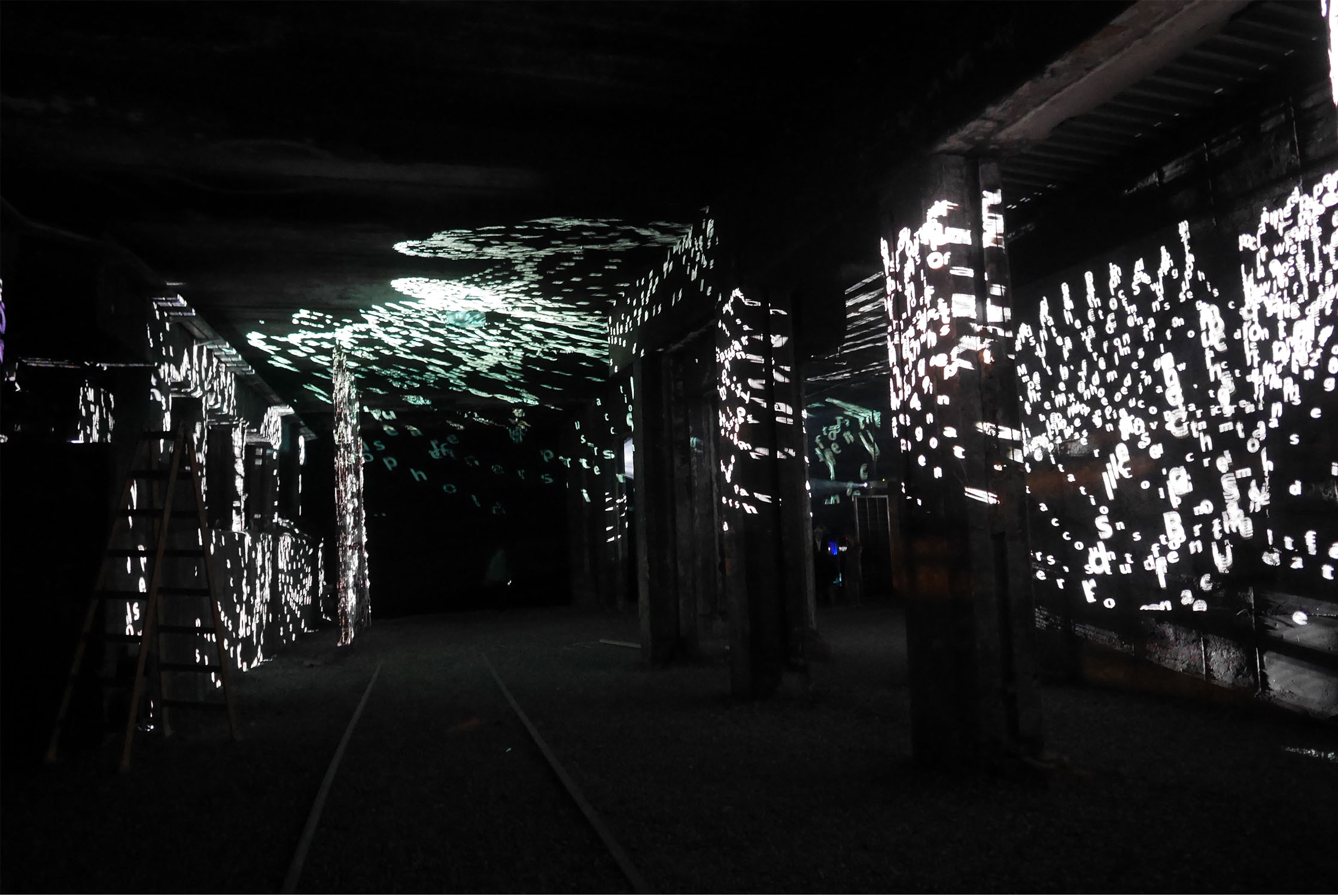
Data Steel, Colours of Ostrava. Software (Java), projectors, old iron mill

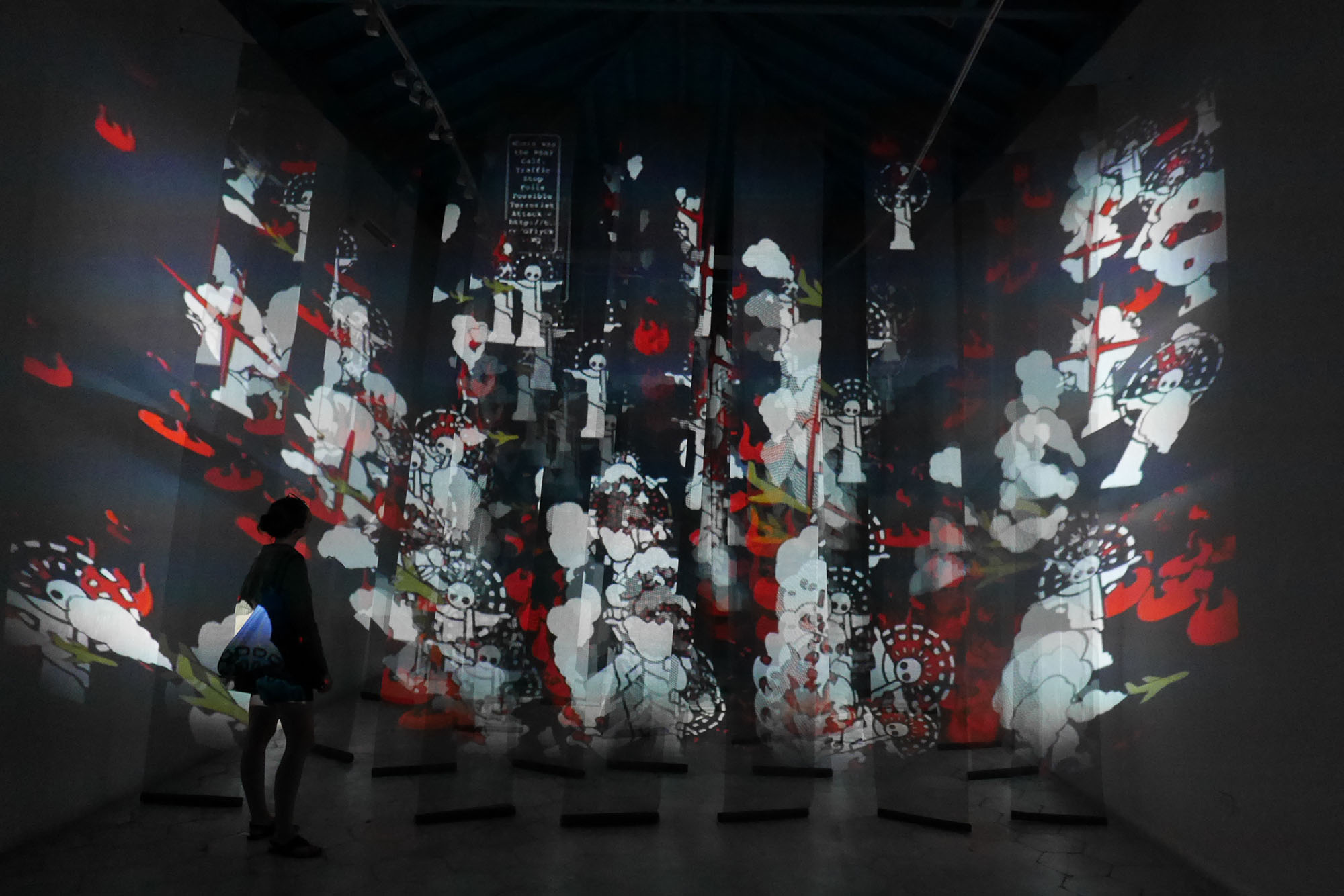
Lost (Version), extract of the Opera Lost Objects, Centro Contemporameo Wifredo Lam, Havana. Software (Flash), projectors, translucent panels

Since 2011, Richter has utilized outdated mobile phones with low-resolution cameras to document the nighttime scenes of cities in Europe, Asia, South America, and North America. These images typically depict blurred human figures and are captured in technically degraded environments, often illuminated by backlight.

Richter has participated in numerous international exhibitions, festivals, and projects. Along with virtual exhibitions and artworks shown at the Biennale Sevilla, Museum Kunstpalast, Telegrafenamt Vienna, Art Center Nabi Seoul in South Korea, the Künstlerhaus Vienna, the DOX in Prague and the ZKM Museum für Neue Kunst in Karlsruhe.

== Exhibitions ==
Richter had a group exhibition at the 2nd Zlín Youth Salon (2000). And her first billboard project in the city of Zlín, Czech Republic, titled Pure Love, exhibited as part of the 3rd Zlín Youth Salon (2003). Later she continued with Guerilla public billboard projects in Prague, Czech Republic (2004). Her second major group exhibition was the seminal World as Structure, Structure as Image Exhibition at Gallery At the White Unicorn, Klatovy, Czech Republic, in 2003. A retrospective of Richter's work in collaboration with Michael Bielicky was held at the Centro de Arte Contemporáneo Wifredo Lam in Havana, Cuba. Her first major painting exhibition ended in September 2019. A retrospective of Richter's work in collaboration with Michael Bielicky is held at the ZKM Karlsruhe until march 2020. Her work with Michael Bielický, "SEVENTYNINE" (2021), was exhibited at the Kunsthalle Praha in 2022.

Richter's work also appeared in seminal group exhibitions such as Biennale Moscow, Moscow (2011), Havana Biennale, Sevilla (2012), Globale, ZKM (2015), and Open Codes, ZKM (2017).

== Literature ==
- Michaela Vlková. Internet Art vs. Art on the Internet. In: Umělec magazine 03/2000. Prague, PNS/Transpress/Kosmas. Pp. 44ff. ASIN B010I9C6VS
- Galerie Klatovy/Klenová (Ed.). Svět jako struktura, struktura jako obraz (World as Structure, Structure as Image). Galerie Klatovy, Klenová. 2003. ISBN 8085628813
- Pavel Liška (Ed.). HfBK Dresden - AVU Prag : Begegnung in Regensburg; zwei traditionsreiche Kunstakademien stellen sich vor. Museum Ostdeutsche Galerie, Regensburg. 2004. ISBN 3891881061
- Gemeinsam in Bewegung, Zeitgenössische Kunst aus Deutschland und China. Wuhan. Kunstverlag der Verlagsgruppe Yangtse, Provinz Hubei 2009. pp. 69 ff. ISBN 9787539430621
- Hans Belting, Andrea Buddensieg, Peter Weibel. Exhibition Catalogue: The Global Contemporary and the Rise of New Worlds. ZKM 2013. pp. 328 ff. ISBN 9780262518345
- Maria Christine Hoffer, Barbara Höller. Exhibition Catalogue: Time(less) signs, Contemporary Art in Reference to Otto Neurath. Künstlerhaus k/haus, Vienna 2013. pp. 106–107. ISBN 9783866787926
- Renate Buschmann, Darija Simunovic. Exhibition Catalogue: The Invisible Force Behind. Materiality in Media Art. Inter Media Art Institute, NRW-Forum. Düsseldorf 2014. pp. 28 ff. ISBN 9783862063871
- Davina Jackson. SuperLux, Smart Light Art, Design & Architecture for Cities. Thames & Hudson 2015. pp. 92 ff. ISBN 9780500343043

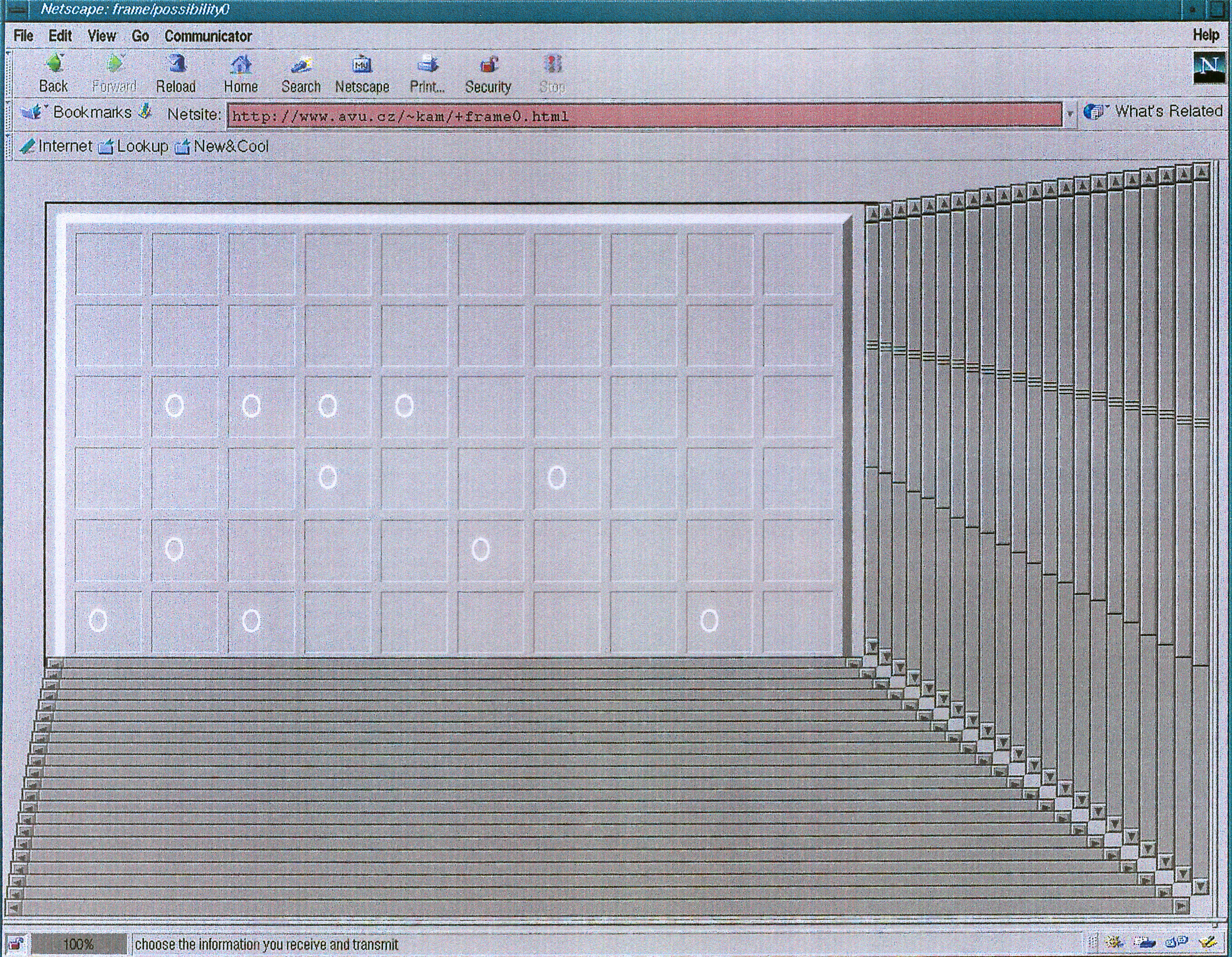
Kamila B. Richter - 0-System. Information gets reduced to a single sign that denotes the presence of information. With each executed choice the selection area shrinks until no space is left for the choice to be made, even though nothing particular has been selected or achieved by the selection process.
