= International Video Corporation =

International Video Corporation (IVC) was a California company with large European operations that manufactured a number of models of middle to high-end video tape recorders, or VTRs, for industrial and professional use in the US, alongside a range of digital video Time Base Correctors and Special Effects units designed and manufactured in the UK. Their products were very popular in the industrial, scientific, research, medical, education, and institutional markets from the late 1960s through the 1980s.

As well as the large US market, IVC products were particularly successful in Great Britain where IVC had a subsidiary company, IVC UK Ltd.

== IVC 800 series 1-inch VTR ==
The IVC 800 series 1-inch VTR was very popular. 800 series were reel-to-reel helical 'mid band' professional color VTRs using 1 inch/25mm tape running at 17.2 cm per second/6.77 inches/second. Variants included slow motion and editing models, and all were available in NTSC, PAL, and SECAM. Many special versions were designed and supplied for high-bandwidth instrumentation recording. The European versions of the IVC800 in PAL and SECAM were particularly popular in Great Britain, France, and Germany where IVC operated subsidiary companies. The VTRs were also branded for Bell & Howell who were a big player in the instrumentation recording market at the time. Bell & Howell also provided some financial support to IVC in the founding days, as well as a number of key engineering and commercial staff.

Over 13,000 IVC800 series were sold worldwide from the late 1960s through to 1989. Prices (in 1970) for the 800 series ranged from US$5,000 for the basic 801 record/play machine to US$10,000 for the 871 insert and assemble edit version. The 800 series, together with spares, accessories, service and support, gave rise to revenues in excess of two hundred million dollars during the 20-year lifetime of the range. IVC's other professional video products contributed a similar amount. The company was a substantial business in both the US and the UK with high-tech headquarters at Sunnyvale in Silicon Valley, and at Reading England in the Thames Valley equivalent.

Major sales breakthroughs against competition came in 1968 when joint technical trials were held in London by the Inner London Education TV service and The University of London TV service. Both services were mandated to run with full broadcast standards and were headed by ex ITV Chief Engineers. The IVC 871 won the trials and subsequently became the “de facto” standard for education broadcast networks in Britain and most of Northern Europe. Other important milestones were the choice by the Royal Aircraft Research Establishment for a large number of MOD instrumentation projects, and the choice by the British Aircraft Corporation for monitoring multiple performance factors in the development models of the supersonic Concorde. In all of the competitive trials leading to multiple sales, the IVC800's 5.0 MHz bandwidth and high S/N ratio were unbeatable in 1” VTRs at that time.

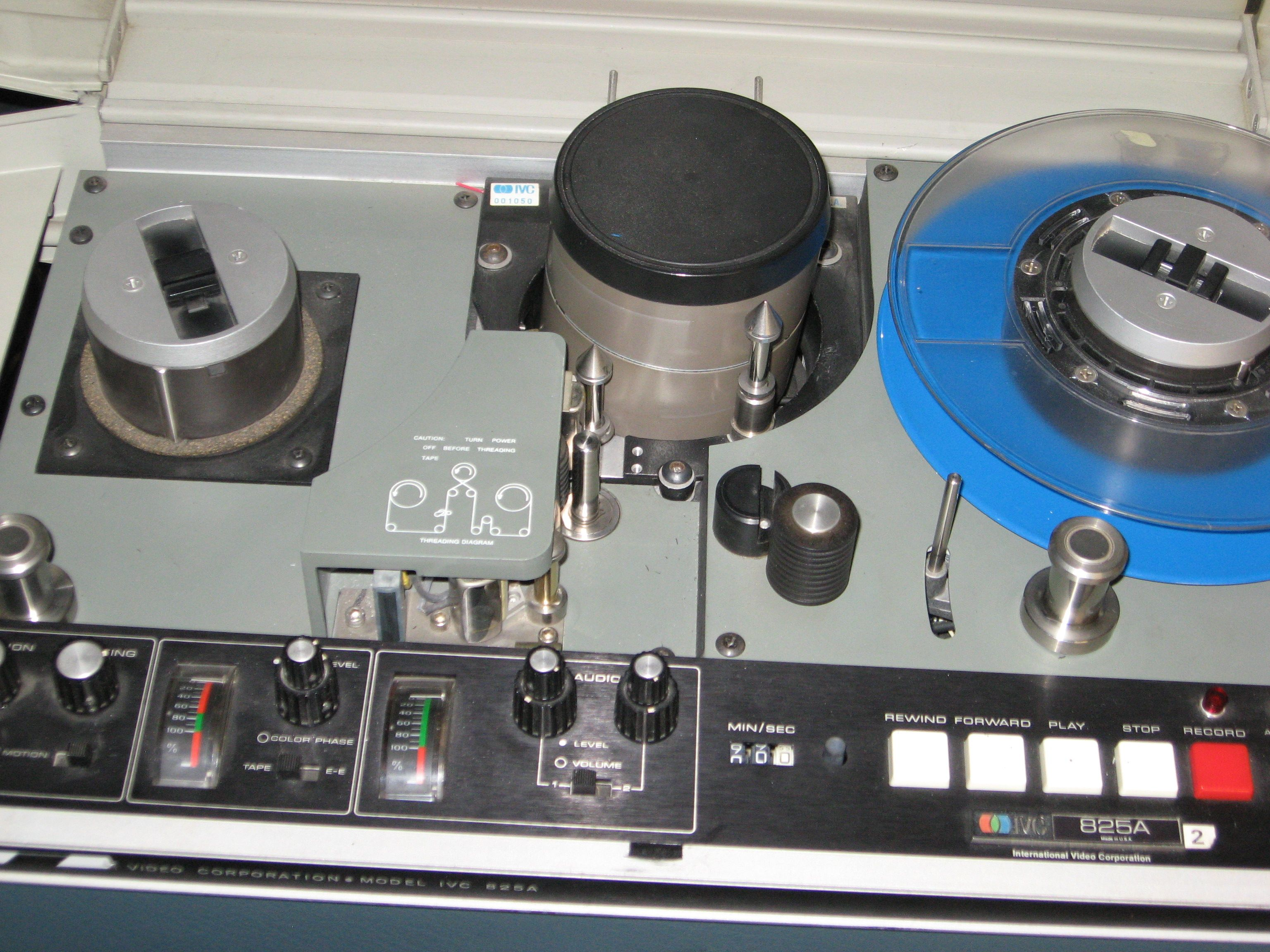
IVC 825A at DC Video ,

== IVC UK Ltd ==
The largest IVC subsidiary company was the British, Reading-based, IVC UK Ltd which not only sold and serviced the IVC800 series (all with a “1” suffix in Europe, eg. 801, 871, etc.) but also designed and produced a range of complementary Digital Time Base Correctors, Dual Imaging Effects Units, and Zoom Machines. IVC UK Ltd became the most profitable part of the IVC operation and was subsequently purchased by Carlton Communications plc in 1982 giving Carlton an entry into the TV equipment business. IVC UK Ltd went on to outlive its original Californian parent and generated major profits for Carlton.

IVC UK Ltd also re-engineered the IVC7000P broadcast portable colour camera in 1975 in order to meet the IBA code of practice. The UK IVC7000P subsequently became the pioneering forerunner of today's field production systems. The IVC7000P was used by LWT, Thames TV, Southern TV, ATV, Grampian TV, Harlech TV, and many of London's independent TV production companies in the 1970s.

The R & D and support operations at IVC UK Ltd were particularly strong and went on to engineer many other products, and product variants, not least of which was the world's first Digital Audio transport for Decca records, and then the supply of IVC9000 transports for the world's first Digital Video recording project at the famous Independent Broadcasting Authority research centre in the UK at Crawley Court.

After IVC UK Ltd was sold by its Californian parent to Carlton in 1982, the company continued to prosper, with the mid-1980s being particularly profitable. IVC UK Ltd won a Royal Television Society award in 1984 for “the outstanding new product of the year”, and a Queen's Award for Technology in 1985.

It was widely reported that Carlton's ownership did not initially interfere, it was purely a financial investment. However, the success of IVC UK Ltd in producing cash, profits, and prestigious awards was beyond Carlton's expectations and encouraged Carlton to buy other businesses in the field, including Cox Electronics and Abekas Video Systems. That in turn led to group rationalisation whereby IVC UK Ltd and Cox were forced to merge with competitor Abekas. IVC UK and Cox management advised Carlton that such a merger would not work well due to operational style and product overlap, but the advice was not heeded. Key management and engineers left, and the merger was not beneficial to IVC UK or Cox products. Abekas however gained access to IVC's European sales network and thus achieved a rapid sales boost, albeit a short-term one. Carlton then sold the combination to Scitex in 1992, at which time the IVC name was finally lost.

The IVC UK premises in Reading have now been converted into a large complex of funeral parlours and associated offices for the high-tech, high-growth, town of Reading. Ex IVC UK engineers and customers (and indeed others) may see that as a comment on the buying and selling of talented people and businesses.

== IVC 9000 ==
One of the last US-designed products was the legendary IVC model 9000 VTR, considered by many experts to be the best analog VTR ever made. It used 2" tape, much like the 2" Quadruplex format, but used segmented helical scanning for the recording and playback of the video tracks (as opposed to 2" Quadruplex's transverse scanning). Vacuum column tape handling and modular plug-in electronics made the machine a delight to work with, and the multi-generation capability was exceptional. The IVC9000 was also the first production machine to fully meet the complex editing requirements of the PAL eight-field sequence.

In order to assist with sales and marketing, IVC entered into a partnership with Rank Cintel in England for certain sections of the PAL market, and Thomson CSF in France for the SECAM market. Rank and Thomson both contributed to the design costs in return for their exclusive market arrangements. Furthermore, the styling of the IVC 9000 was made to match Rank Cintel's highly successful Broadcast Telecine machines. This arrangement expired when IVC in California ceased operations, at which time all sales and marketing were taken over by IVC UK who had a substantial 9000 inventory and were, therefore, able to continue to supply and support the PAL and SECAM markets.

The 9000 was used for the production of many popular television series from the mid-1970s to the early 1980s, as it was capable of higher quality through many more generations than other available products. It was extensively used in mastering and duplication centres where high quality coupled with long head life and low tape wear were important. However, the high R & D costs from the development of the 9000 caused IVC in California to cease operations in the early 1980s, although IVC in the UK and Europe continued and expanded as successful independent businesses.

Many engineers and users consider that the IVC9000 with its superior performance should have sold in bigger numbers. The list price of US$80,000 was certainly not a barrier as competing Quad machines generally cost significantly more. However, a battle of 2” broadcast format wars was waged strongly by the Quad manufacturers who feared for their earlier monopoly. This kept many otherwise enthusiastic customers waiting for an outcome. The irony was that ultimately the battle was overtaken by 1” format B and C machines which had significantly inferior performance, but far lower prices.

Some of the first LaserDisc releases on the market from Discovision were mastered by the company using IVC 9000 VTRs for master videotape playback for making glass masters during the laserdisc replication process. Discovision later switched to using 1" Type C videotape around the early 1980s for laserdisc mastering when IVC ceased 9000 support in the US.

The IVC9000 was (like its smaller sister 800 products) well utilised in Great Britain. The BBC used it in five regions, and many London Independents operated the IVC9000 for mastering and duplication. The final two IVC9000s were installed by IVC UK Ltd in 1980 and ran successfully alongside the many other British 9000 installations using local British-made video heads for over ten years. IVC UK also made video heads for the 1” 800 series in partnership with local glass bonding ferrite manufacturer Ferrac. These heads enabled the operation of both the 1” and 2” machines in Britain long after the US spares supply ceased.

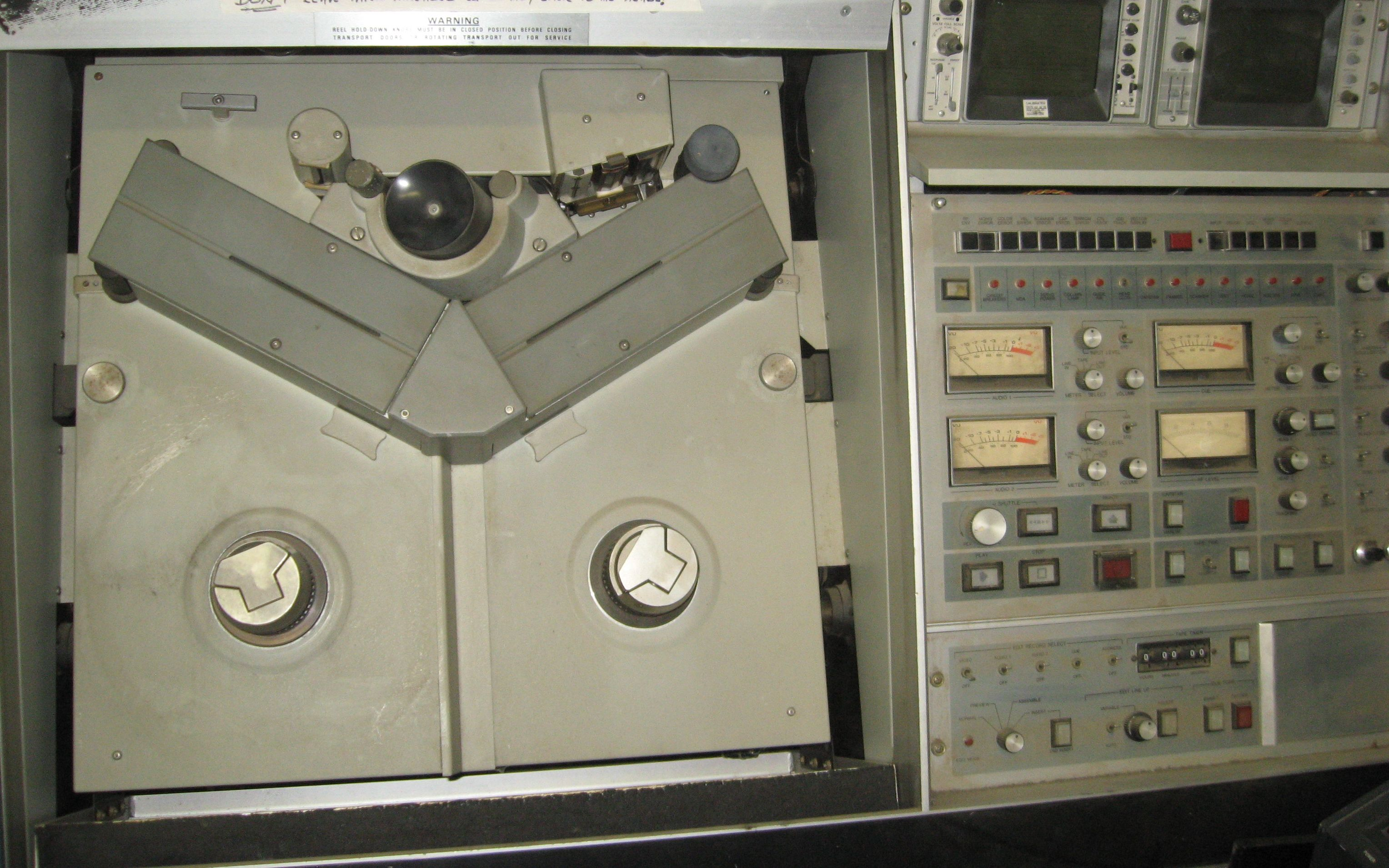
IVC-9000 VTR from DC Video, ,

== TBCs, Frame stores, Gemini and Zeno ==
In the early 1970s, IVC entered into an arrangement with UK company Quantel for the design of a Digital Time Base Corrector (TBC) to enable the output of the 800 series VTRs to be synchronous with the studio drives, hence enabling mixing and switching as if the VTR was another studio live source. The result was the IVC2000 in NTSC and the IVC2001 in PAL and SECAM. These TBCs were the first full eight-bit broadcast-capable devices and were very well received. Quantel subsequently moved into other areas of digital TV equipment and the arrangement terminated when the 2000/2001 design team left in 1976. Several of the 2000/2001 team subsequently joined IVC UK Ltd in 1978 and then commenced work on a replacement. The result was a more compact and economic TBC, the IVC2002, and a full frame store version, the IVC8000. Both were again well received and sold in large numbers at prices between GB£8,000 and GB£12,000. They were exclusively designed for PAL and SECAM for IVC UK's European markets and were designed, supported, and manufactured at a new factory facility in Reading England. Their release in 1980 marked the beginning of totally independent operations for IVC UK Ltd.

The UK design team grew further as IVC UK Ltd significantly expanded its premises and CAD facilities. This resulted in an entirely new modular design concept leading to further groundbreaking digital TV products which included substantial software code. This was considered quite pioneering in the TV equipment business which had been mostly hardware dominated up to that time. The first resulting product was a dual TBC with picture-moving effects and mixing, the IVC Gemini, which was released at the 1983 Montreux TV Symposium to packed crowds. Large orders were placed Europe-wide, with IVC's early partner Bell & Howell undertaking distribution in some markets not covered by IVC's own network. The Gemini dual TBC was a great success selling for GB£15,000 list. It was produced at IVC UK's Reading England factory at the rate of ten per week for many years. The name Gemini was somewhat obviously chosen for the “twin” electronics.

Shortly after the release of Gemini, IVC UK Ltd completed the design of the digital zoom and effects unit, Zeno, released at the International Broadcasting Convention in the autumn of 1984, again to crowds of enthusiastic video engineers. The IVC Zeno was promoted as “The affordable zoom machine” and carried a list price of GB£21,000. At that time competing devices cost more than twice as much. The IVC Zeno was an outstanding success and was produced at IVC UK's Reading England factory alongside the Gemini. Production peaked at six per week during the mid-1980s. The name Zeno was chosen after the “God of altered images”.

== Other IVC products ==
In 1979, the IVC-1010, a 1-inch VTR based on the 800 transport, but with new electronics and control systems was introduced. It was capable of recording a 10 MHz bandwidth, designed for medical and scientific markets, but the US operation of IVC did not follow through with volume production.

Besides VTRs, IVC also manufactured other types of video equipment, such as studio video cameras and edit controllers. The early color cameras were used in many institutional, scientific and medical applications and were also branded for sale by Bell & Howell. The later broadcast series 7000 cameras were not as widely used due to cheaper competition emerging from far eastern manufacturers by that time, but the pioneering 7000P portable field production camera was re-engineered by IVC UK to meet the IBA broadcast code of practice and then did achieve significant broadcast success in Britain as noted in the IVC UK section above.

IVC UK Ltd also designed, equipped and commissioned mobile TV Outside Broadcast vehicles which were sold not only in the UK but also to emerging TV stations in the Middle East and Africa.
