= Tri-level sync =

Analogue video synchronization

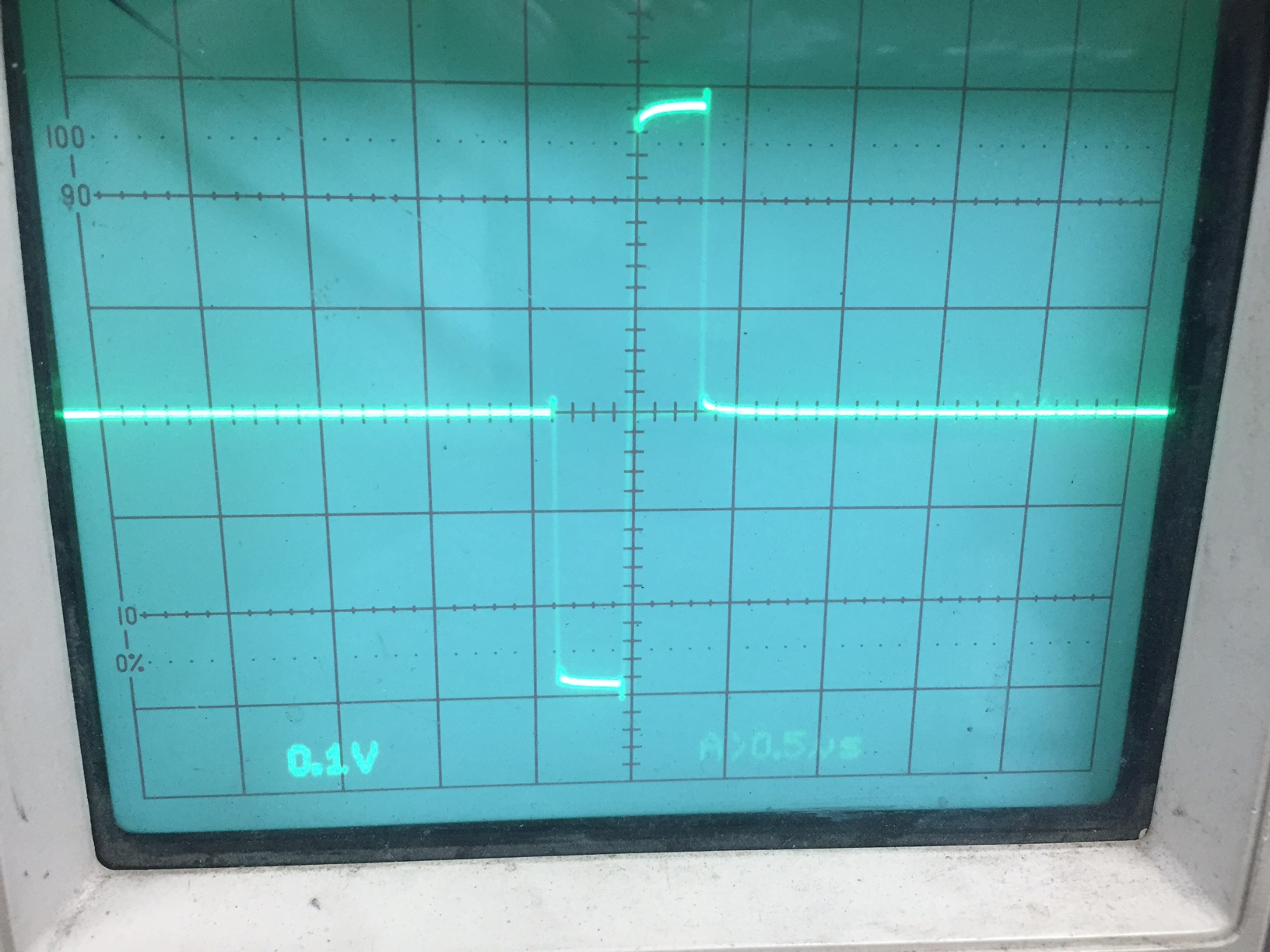
An oscilloscope trace of a tri-level sync pulse

Tri-level sync is an analogue video synchronization pulse primarily used for the locking of high-definition video signals (genlock).

It is preferred in HD environments over black and burst, as timing jitter is reduced due to the nature of its higher frequency. It also benefits from having no DC content, as the pulses are in both polarities.

== Synchronization ==
Modern real-time multi-source HD facilities have many pieces of equipment that all output HD-SDI video. If this baseband video is to be mixed, switched or luma keyed with any other sources, then they will need to be synchronous, i.e. the first pixel of the first line must be transmitted at the same time (within a few microseconds). This then allows the switcher to cut, mix or key these sources together with a minimal amount of delay (~1 HD video line 1/(1125×25) seconds for 50i video). This synchronization is done by supplying each piece of equipment with either a tri-level sync, or black-and-burst input. There are video switchers that do not require synchronous sources, but these operate with a much bigger delay.

== Waveform ==
The main pulse definition is as follows: a negative-going pulse of 300 mV lasting 40 sample clocks followed by a positive-going pulse of 300 mV lasting 40 sample clocks. The allowed rise/fall time for each of the transitions is 4 sample clocks. This is with a clock rate of 74.25 MHz.
