= Genlock =

Video synchronization to a reference

Genlock (generator locking) is a technique for synchronizing multiple sources based on one source or on a reference signal from a signal generator.

In video applications, the goal is to ensure synchronous timing across multiple inputs to, for example, cut between multiple camera recordings of a live event.

When sources are synchronized in this way, they are said to be generator-locked, or genlocked.

== History ==
In September 2025, Apple announced that the iPhone 17 Pro and the iPhone 17 Pro Max would have genlock support. Earlier devices with genlock capability included the Commodore Amiga.

== Scope ==
Generator locking can be used to synchronize as few as two isolated sources (e.g., a television camera and a videotape machine feeding a vision mixer (production switcher)), or in a wider facility where all the video sources are locked to a single synchronizing pulse generator (e.g., a fast-paced sporting event featuring multiple cameras and recording devices). Generator locking can also be used to ensure that multiple CRT monitors that appear in a movie are flicker-free. Generator locking is also used to synchronize two cameras for Stereoscopic 3D video recording.

In broadcast systems, an analog generator-lock signal usually consists of vertical and horizontal synchronizing pulses together with chrominance phase reference in the form of the color burst. No picture information is usually carried to avoid disturbing the timing signals, and the name reference, black and burst, color black, or black burst is usually given to such a signal. A composite colour video signal inherently carries the same reference signals and can be used as a generator-locking signal, albeit at the risk of being disturbed by out-of-specification picture signals.

Although some high-definition broadcast systems may use a standard-definition reference signal as a generator-locking reference signal, the use of tri-level synchronising pulses directly related to the frame and line rate is increasing within HD systems. A tri-level sync pulse is a signal that initially goes from 0 volts DC to a negative voltage, then a positive voltage, before returning to zero volts DC again. The voltage excursions are typically 300 mV on either side of zero volts, and the duration of each of the two excursions is the same as a particular number of digital picture samples.

== Possible problems ==
Video signals generated and output by generator-locked instruments are said to be syntonized. Syntonized video signals will be precisely frequency-locked, but because of delays caused by the unequal transmission path lengths, the synchronized signals will exhibit differing phases at various points in the television system. Modern video equipment, such as production switchers that have multiple video inputs, often includes a variable delay on each input to compensate for the phase differences and time all the input signals to precise phase coincidence.

Where two or more video signals are combined or being switched between, the horizontal and vertical timing of the picture sources should be coincident with each other. If they are not, the picture will appear to jump when switching between the sources whilst the display device re-adjusts the horizontal and/or vertical scan to correctly reframe the image.

Where composite video is in use, the phase of the chrominance subcarrier of each source being combined or switched should also be coincident. This is to avoid changes in colour hue and/or saturation during a transition between sources.

== Connections ==
Most television studio and professional video cameras have dedicated generator-locking ports on the camera. If the camera is tethered with a triaxial cable or optical fibre cable, the analog generator-locking signal is used to lock the camera control unit, which in turn locks the camera head by means of information carried within a data channel transmitted along the cable. If the camera is an ENG-type camera, one without a triax/fibre connection or without a dockable head, the generator-locking signal is carried through a separate cable from the video.

== Variants ==
Natlock is a picture-source synchronizing system using audio tone signals to describe the timing discrepancies between composite video signals, while Icelock uses digital information conveyed in the vertical blanking interval of a composite video signal.

== See also ==
- Frame synchronizer (video)
- Time base corrector
