= BT.1120 =

Digital interface standard for HDTV studio signals

BT.1120 is a digital interface standard for HDTV studio signals, published by the International Telecommunication Union. As of October 2017, the current version of BT.1120 is BT.1120-8.
