= Black and burst =

Analogue video synchronization signal

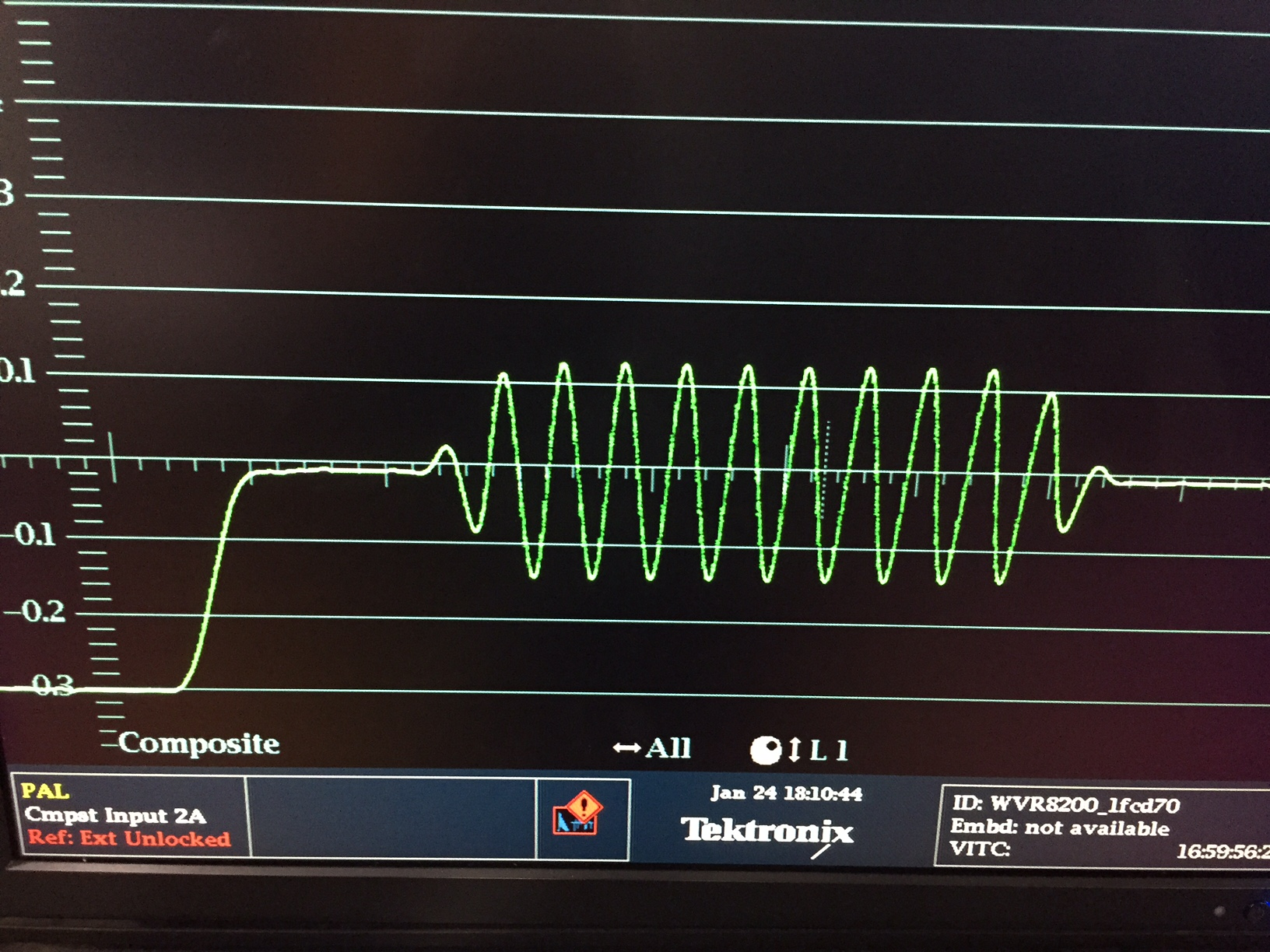
The sub carrier 'burst' seen from waveform monitor

Black and burst, also known as bi-level sync and black burst, is an analogue signal used in broadcasting. It is a composite video signal with a black picture. It is a reference signal used to synchronise video equipment, in order to have them output video signals with the same timing. This allows seamless switching between two video signals.

Black and burst can also be used to synchronise colour phase and provides timing accuracy in the order of tens of nanoseconds which is necessary to perform e.g. analogue video mixing.

Black and burst exists for various colour TV standards, such as PAL, NTSC and SECAM. Because the black and burst signal is a normal video signal, it is transportable via normal video cables and through video distribution equipment.

== History ==
Before colour TV existed, the reference signal was also a black video signal. Inaccuracies meant the video picture would be shifted.

With the introduction of colour, the reference had to be much more accurate. In every composite video signal a reference burst is present in the horizontal sync portion, so all equipment in the chain will be synchronised roughly 16000 times per second. This regular synchronisation is necessary because the colour information is transmitted via quadrature amplitude modulation on the high-frequency colour signal. Incorrect synchronisation means the phase will be off, and consequently the colour will be incorrect. Creating broadcast television usually involves mixing video signals. When doing this in an analogue way, it is essential that all signals have the same colour phase, which was achieved by synchronising all cameras with a black and burst signal. Because of cable length differences, every camera required a (often only slightly) different timing. This could be tuned at the reference source, and/or at the camera.

Black and burst is being replaced by tri-level sync, but as of 2020 it is still quite common. Because the signal chains are now digital, which allows buffering, the timing requirements are not as strict anymore.

== Waveform ==
Its natural waveform is a negative pulse with a level of -40 IRE followed by 10 cycles of the colour sub carrier of video. For most variants of PAL video, the frequency of the sub carrier is 4.43361875 MHz.

== See also ==
- Genlock
- SMPTE 2059
