= Central apparatus room =

Room where shared broadcast equipment is located

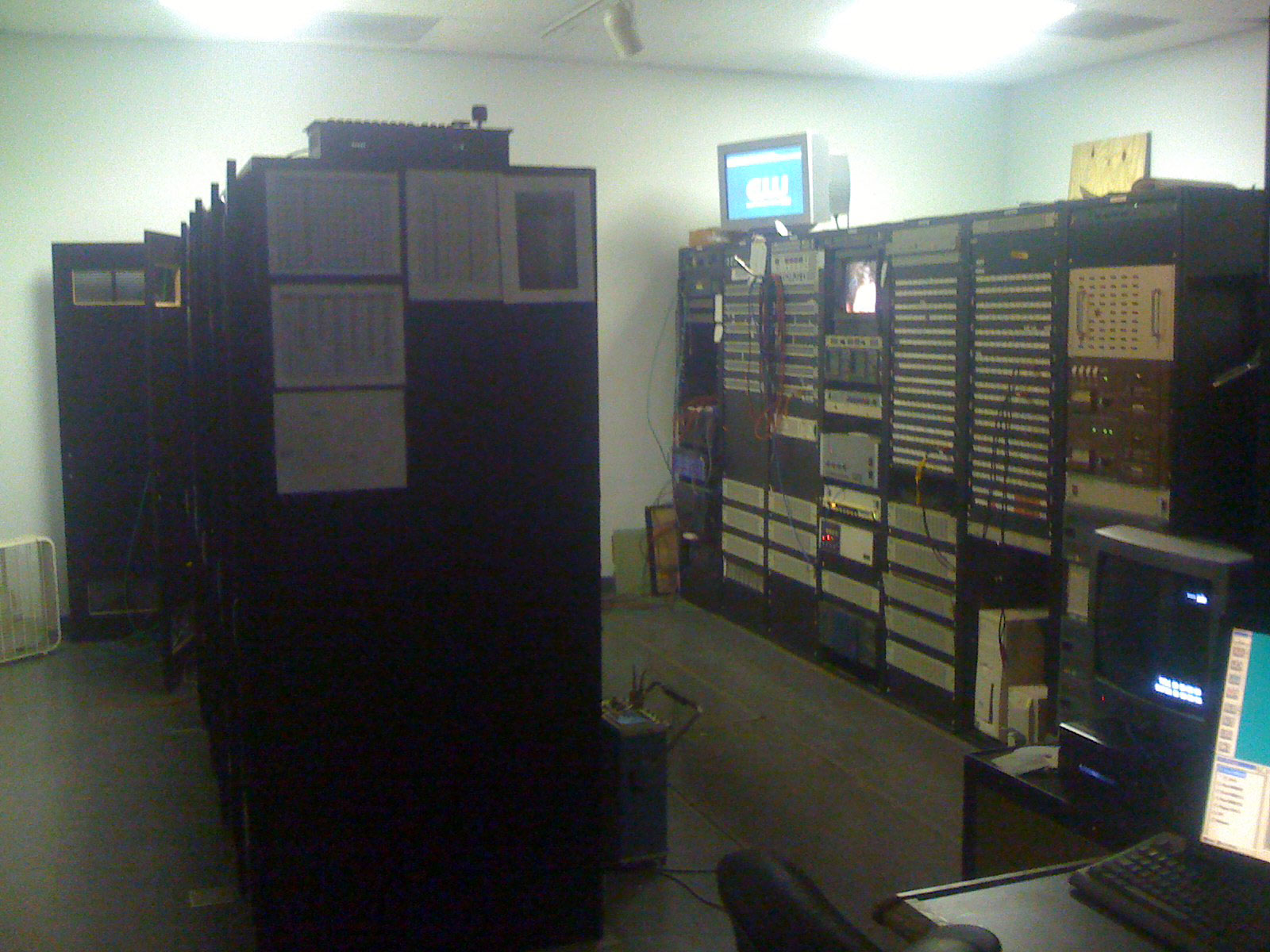
WREX-TV tech core, or CAR

In broadcast facilities and television studios, a central apparatus room (CAR, pronounced "C-A-R"), central machine room, or central equipment room (CER), or central technical area (CTA), or rack room is where shared equipment common to all technical areas is located. Some broadcast facilities have several of these rooms. It should be air-conditioned, however low-noise specifications such as acoustical treatments are optional. Equipment is connected either directly with an attached foldout monitor, keyboard and mouse or remotely via KVM switch, SSH, VNC, RS-232 or remote desktop.

== Equipment ==
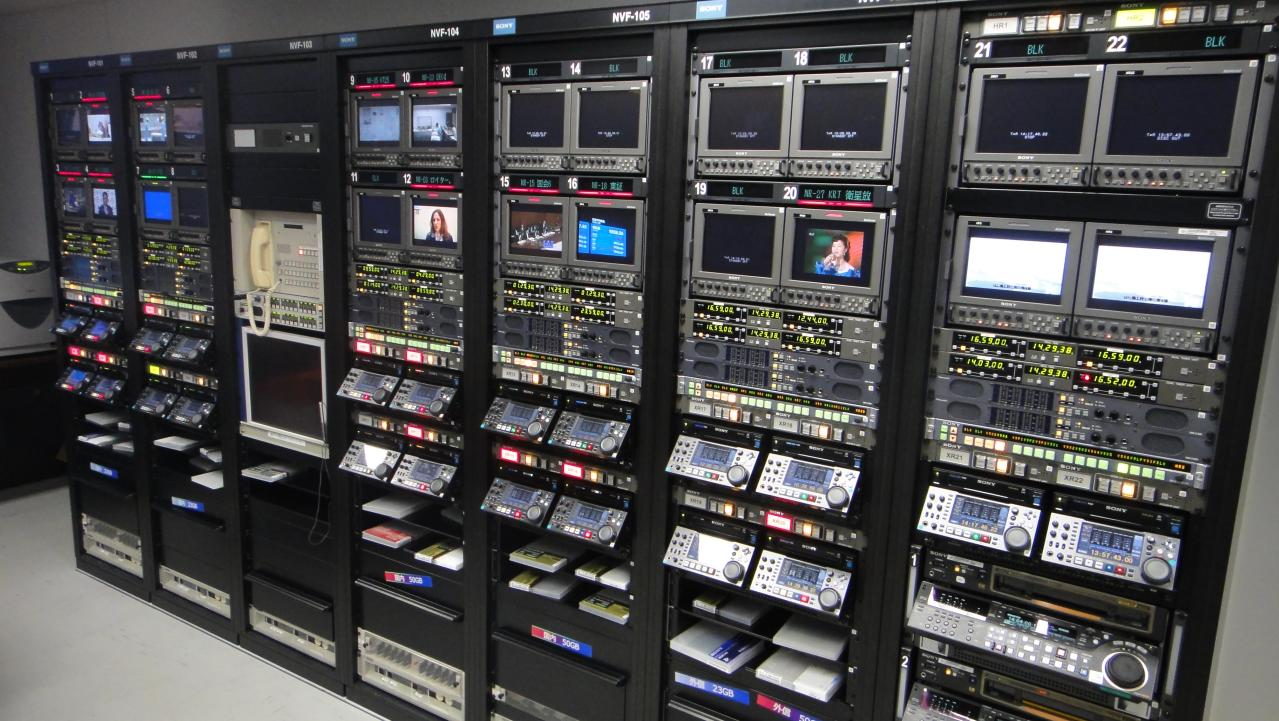
19-inch racks of VTR and Professional Disc decks at Fuji TV

These rooms contain broadcast and broadcast IT mission critical gear necessary to broadcast and television operations. CARs usually house audio routers, video routers, video servers, compressors and multiplexers that utilize broadcast automation systems with broadcast programming applications to playout television programs.

They contain broadcast and monitoring equipment, through which all the operations are monitored by the transmission engineer, without disturbing the studio recordings. CER may also house analog and digital TV transmission systems, satellite up-link systems, digital processing synchronizers, video patch panels, and audio patch panels, including video monitors.

=== Common equipment ===
- 19-inch racks
- Antenna tracking system
- Audio router
- Broadcast delay
- Camera control units (CCUs)
- Conditional access system
- Character generator subtitling systems
- Distribution frame
- Digital TV encoder
- Fiber optic transceiver
- Frame synchronizers
- GPS receivers
- High-power amplifiers for transmission (television transmitter)
- Integrated receiver/decoder (IRD)
- IF distribution.
- Media storage
- Multiplexer
- Network switch
- Audio monitoring tools
- Radio frequency devices
- Router
- Serial digital interface (SDI) audio de-embedder
- Talkback (recording)
- Transport stream analyzer
- VTRs and/or VCRs (formerly, replaced with video servers)
- Video router
- Video server (also called playout server)
- Video switcher frame or main unit
- video monitoring tools
- Video monitor
- Vectorscope
- Waveform monitor

== See also ==
- Broadcast engineering
- Data center
- Master control room (MCR)
- Network operations center (NOC)
- Production control room (PCR)
- Server room
- Server farm
- Transmission control room (TCR)
