= Production truck =

Mobile audio and video control room

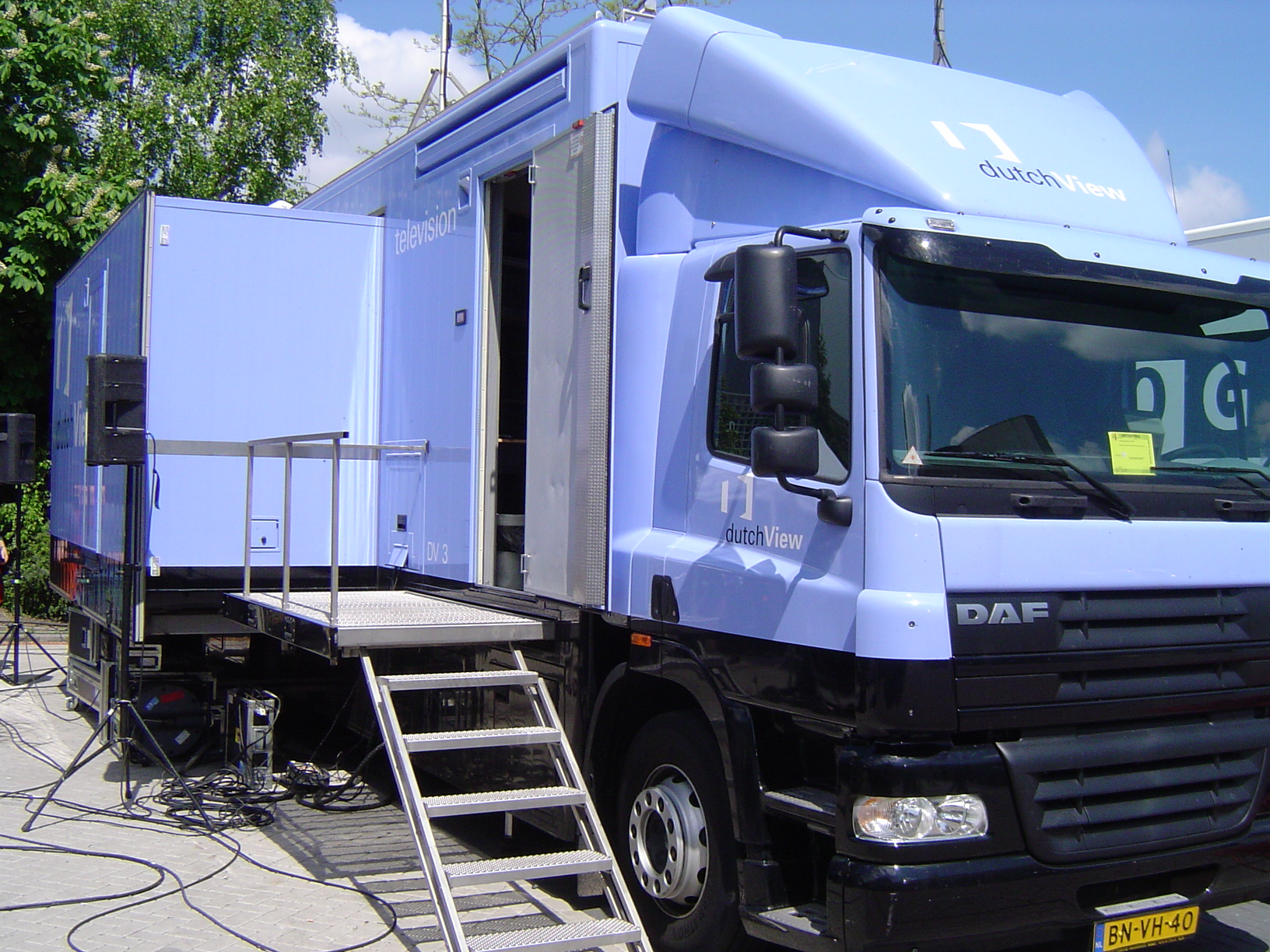
Dutchview's DV3 at AVManifestatie in 2008

A television production truck or OB van is a small mobile production control room to allow filming of events and video production at locations outside a regular television studio. They are used for remote broadcasts, outside broadcasting (OB), and electronic field production (EFP). Some require a crew of as many as 30 people, with additional trucks for additional equipment as well as a satellite truck, which transmits video back to the studio by sending it up through a communications satellite using a satellite dish, which then transmits it back down to the studio. Alternatively, some production trucks include a satellite transmitter and satellite dish for this purpose in a single truck body to save space, time and cost.

Other television production trucks are smaller in size and generally require two or three people in the field to manage. For instance broadcast journalism reporters providing live television, local news in the field electronic news gathering (ENG) outside a formal television studio. In some cases, it can be a station wagon, people carrier or even a motorbike (especially in cities with congested streets or where a rapid response is needed and a motorbike is more manoeuvrable).

== History ==
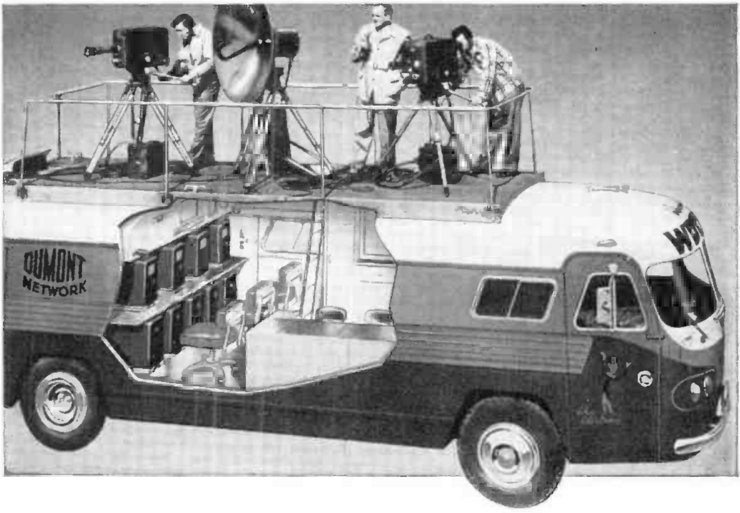
Dumont Telecruiser, an early production truck developed by the US DuMont Television Network in 1949

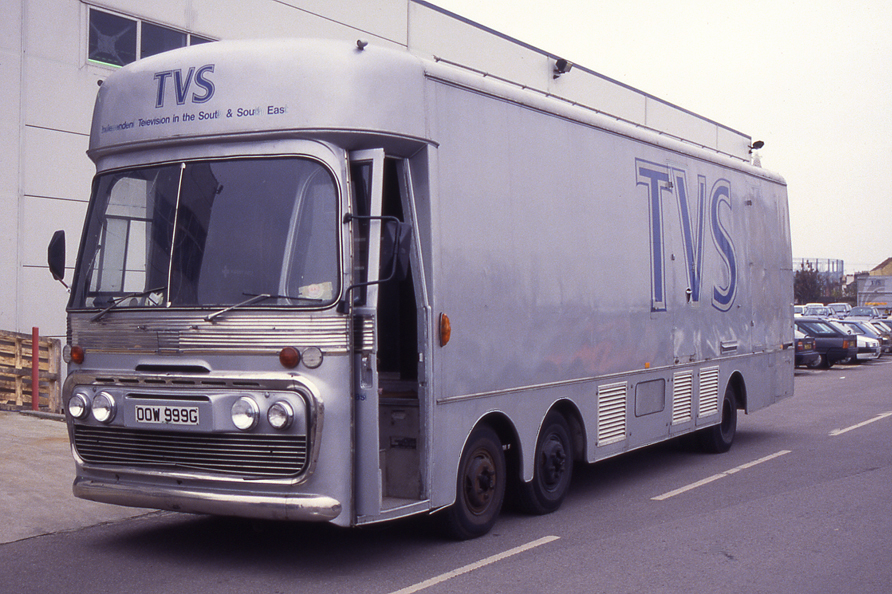
Television South (TVS) OB Unit 1, a Bedford VAL in 1991

One of the BBC's early Outside Broadcast vehicles, MCR 1 (short for Mobile Control Room), was built by the joint Marconi-EMI company and delivered to the BBC just in time to televise the Coronation of George VI and Elizabeth in May 1937. MCR 2 was identical to MCR 1 and was delivered in the summer of 1938. The MCRs could handle three cameras. Initially, they were standard Emitrons, but were later supplemented by Super Emitrons, which performed much better than the standard ones in low light. The MCRs were built on the chassis of an AEC Regal single-decker bus.

After World War II, the joint company Marconi-EMI ceased. The BBC ordered two 3-camera MCRs from EMI. The cameras were equipped with CPS tubes, had electronic viewfinders and a 3-lens turret. MCR 4 was delivered in time to be used on the 1948 Olympics.

The BBC continued to develop mobile control rooms throughout the 1950s and 60s. The 1955 MCR13 was the unit the famous Dinky Toys BBC OB van was based on. MCR13 was equipped with three Marconi Image Orthicon cameras using the newly developed 4.5 inch tube. The further evolution of camera and mixing equipment led to the BBC 1963 specification TV90. Ten OB vans were built by Pye to this specification, with the coachwork by Marshall Bus of Cambridge. Pye called them “Main Fleet Scanners”. MCR19 was the first and MCR28 was the final development of the monochrome OB van series. These were equipped with four Pye MK6 cameras, built to meet the BBC specification.

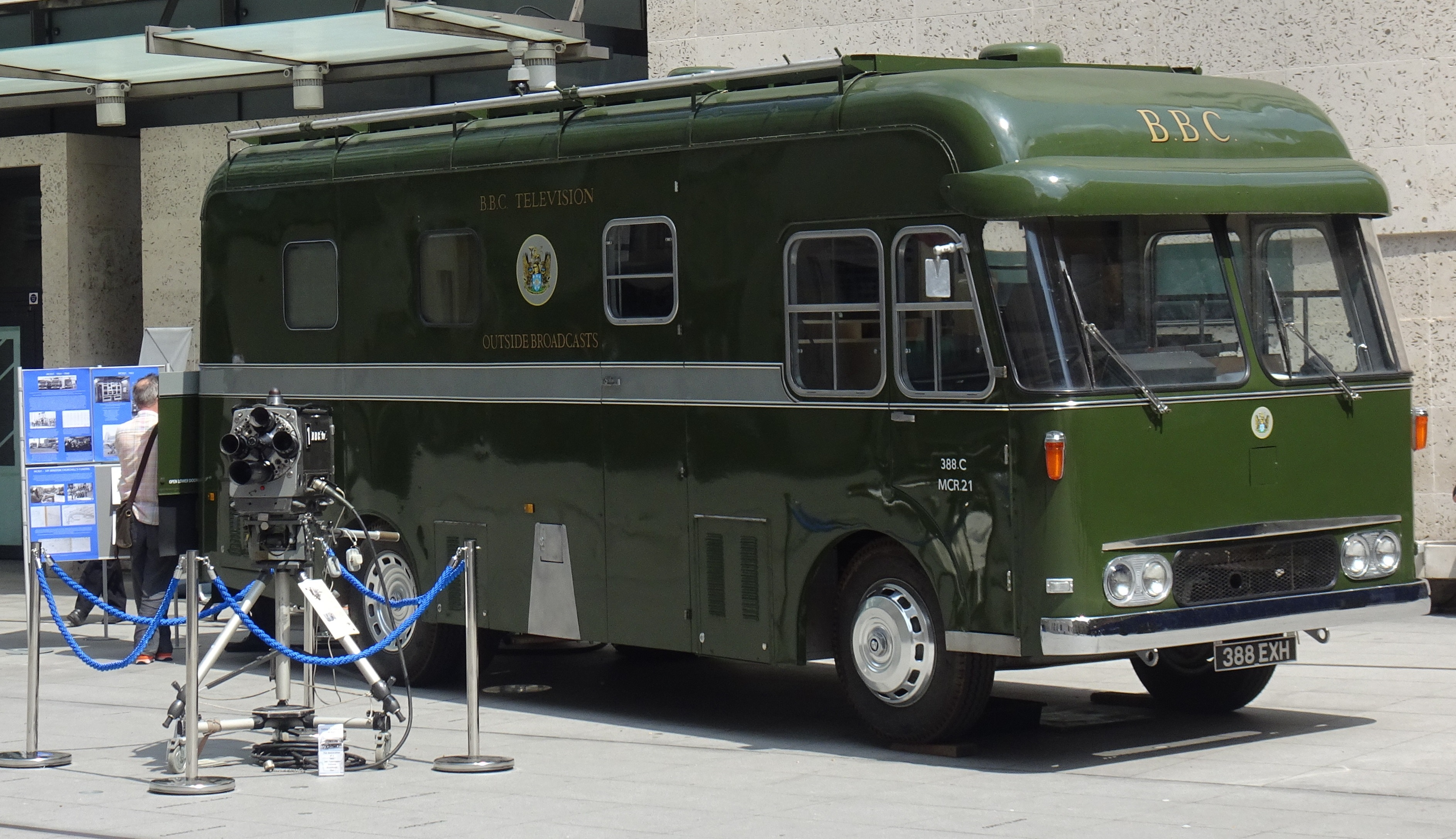
Restored 1963 BBC scanner MCR21, with Pye Mk6 tv camera, at Broadcasting House, London, July 2022

After developing colour television in the mid 1960s, the BBC began to develop a fleet of colour OB units, known as CMCRs. Type 2 scanners, introduced in 1969, first came equipped with Pye PC80 cameras but these were soon superseded by EMI 2001 colour cameras. Nine Type 2 vehicles were built by Pye, with these trucks remaining in service through the 1970s and into the mid 1980s. Throughout this time, they would see use on some of the BBC's most prestigious programmes, including Royal Events, Doctor Who, Wimbledon Championships and Question Time. Type 2 units went on to be replaced by Type 5 units.

Although made from converted HGVs, inside these trucks were incredibly cramped as a result of housing all of the components of a television gallery. The vehicles were normally made up of three sections:

- A section to house the camera control units, or CCUs, and camera monitoring equipment. Being so large and complex, these cameras required a team of skilled engineers to keep them functioning. During a production, the camera operator would control the pan and the focus but it was the engineer who controlled the exposure and the colour balance.
- A section for the production crew, led by the director, who would orchestrate the overall production.
- A section for the sound crew which housed their mixing desk and other sound equipment. From here the sound crew controlled not only the sound of the programme but all the production communications which allowed the whole crew to communicate to one another. Without which the production would undoubtedly grind to a halt.

== Interior ==
A typical modern OB vehicle is usually divided into five parts, but many vehicles are customised to specific roles.

=== Production control ===
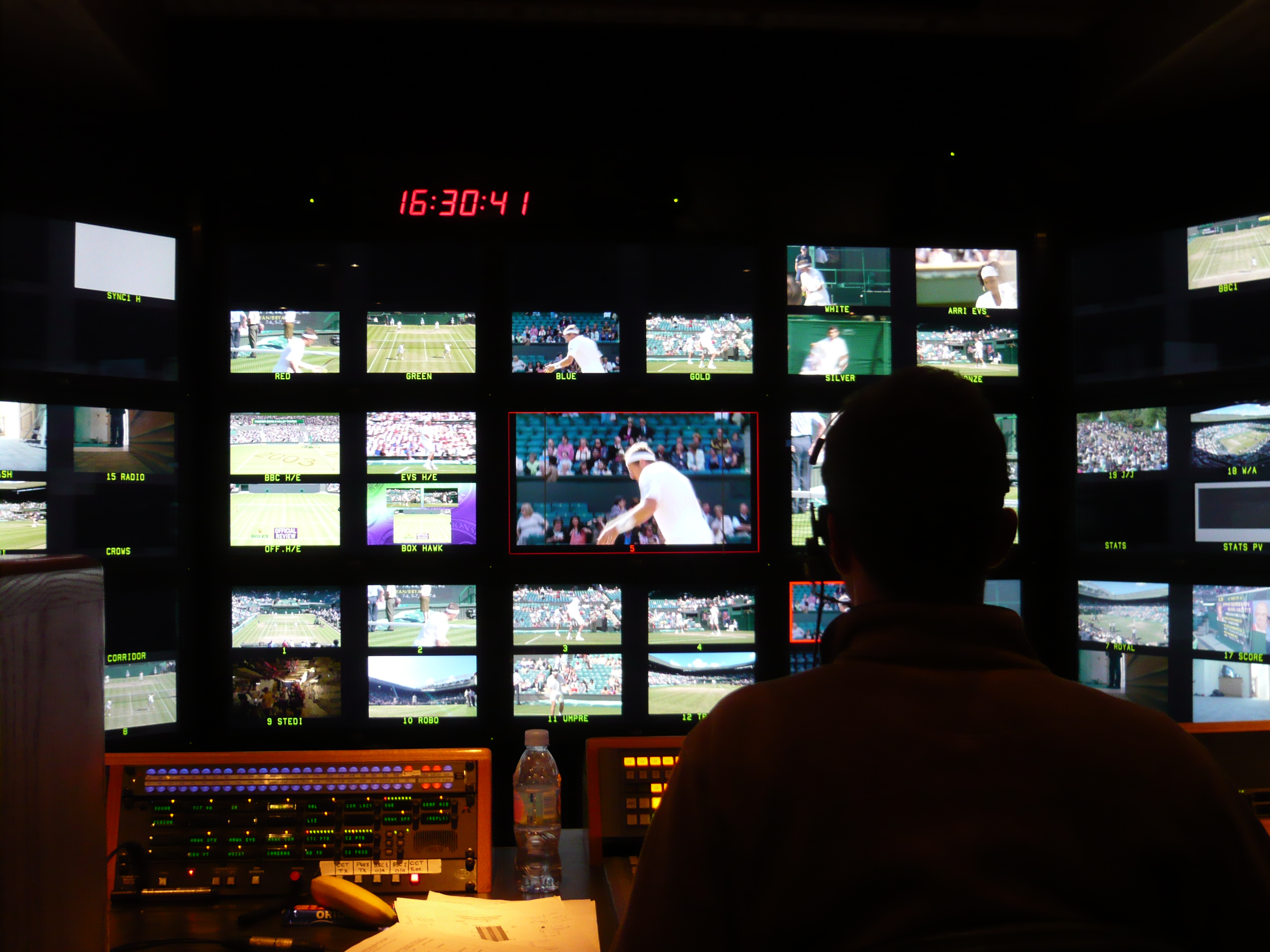
Inside Arena Television OB7's production gallery at the Wimbledon Championships, England

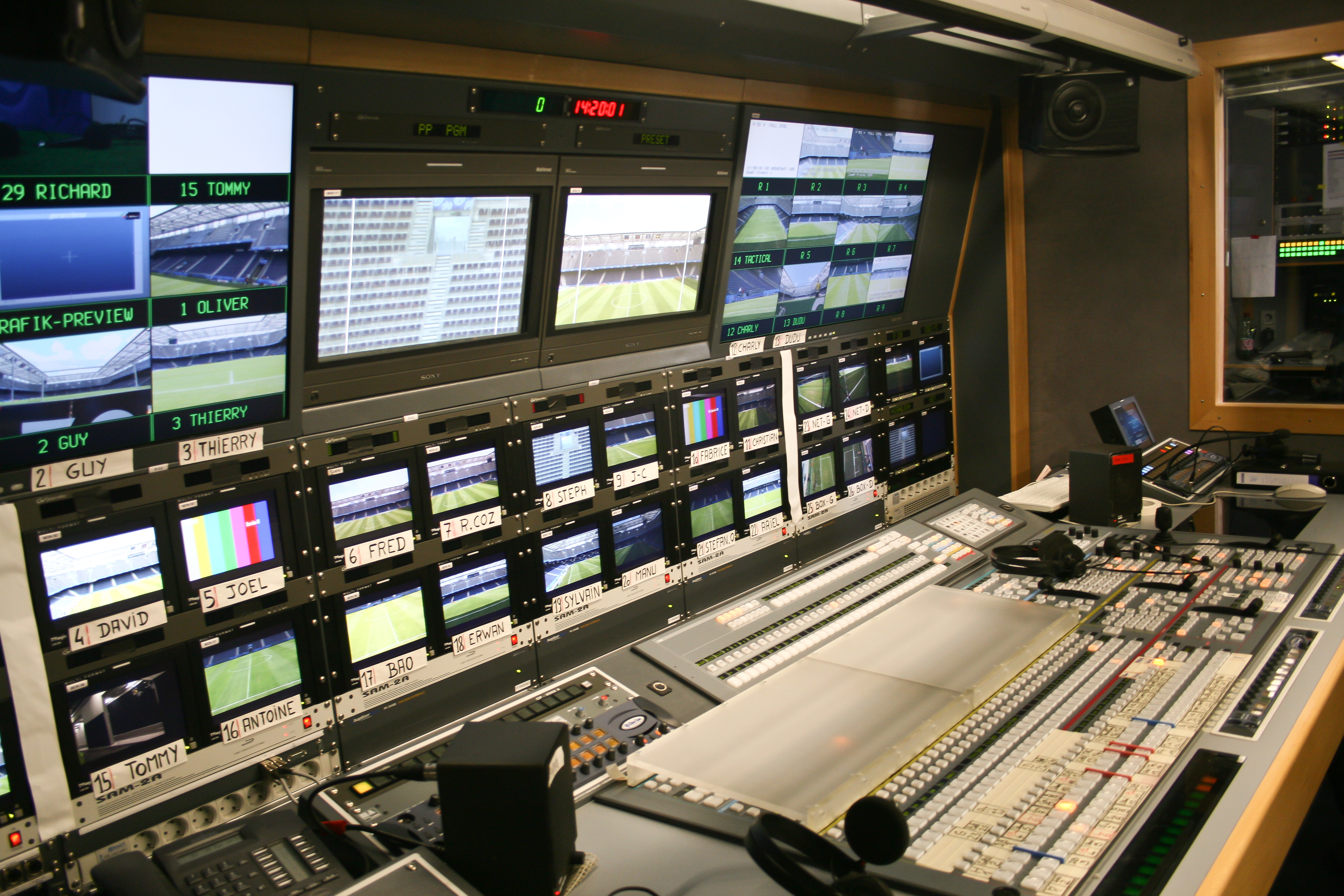
The production control room at an outside broadcast for UEFA Euro 2008

This is the production hub of the vehicle, and is where the majority of the production crew sit in front of a wall of video monitors. The video monitors show all the video feeds from various sources, including computer graphics, professional video cameras, video servers and slow-motion replay machines. The wall of monitors contains a preview monitor showing what could be the next source on air and a program monitor that shows the feed currently going to air or being recorded. The keyed dirty feed (with digital on-screen graphic) is what is actually transmitted back to the central studio that is controlling the outside broadcast. A clean feed (without the graphics) could be sent to other vehicles for use in their production. Behind the directors there is usually a desk with monitors where the assistant producers can work. It is essential that the directors and assistant producers are in communication with each other during events, so that replays and slow-motion shots can be selected and aired.

Chyron, a well known manufacturer of character generators, “keys” graphics over a specified source the TD chooses, but is generally used for images, and lower third messages, as well as occasionally smaller videos. The Bug Box character generator works the same way but is only for sporting events - the operator is in charge of ensuring that the time, score, and statistics are displayed on the broadcast as appropriate.

Crew

Television director – responsible for directing the overall production, including cameras, replays and inserts
Television producers – responsible for the overall running of the production, liaising with talent and choosing when to take commercial breaks
Technical director (also known as a vision mixer) – operates the vision mixer, switching the video sources, including graphics, to air as directed
Production assistant (also known as a script supervisor) – responsible for communicating with the broadcast channel about timings, counting in and out of breaks, and giving timings on replays and packages
Assistant producers – often there will be an assistant producer who will be the communication link between the director and the VTR crew, providing information on which channel has the best replay of a certain moment for example
Graphics Operator and Graphics Coordinator – There are a wide range of digital on-screen graphic elements used in television production.

Equipment

Vision mixer – switch between multiple video feeds to produce an easy-to-watch television experience.
Video monitor – monitor different routable sources on multiple monitors to help select which feed is the best at any given time.
Character generator – used to generate a variety of graphics that can be keyed over a video source.

=== Sound ===
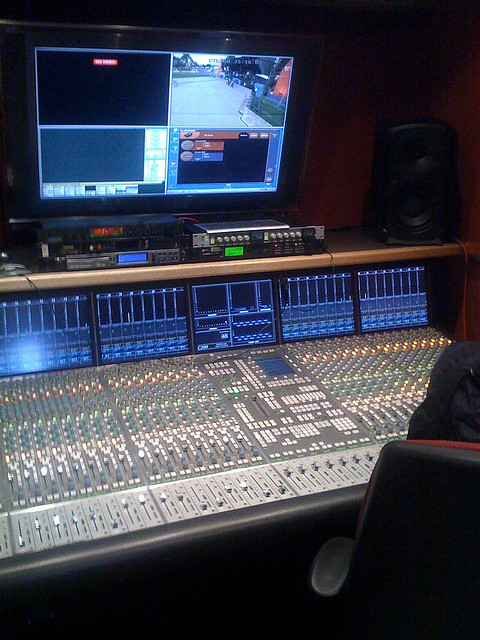
Inside the sound control area of an ABC OB vehicle

This is where the audio engineer (sound supervisor in the UK) uses a mixing console (being fed with all the various audio feeds: reporters, commentary, on-field microphones, etc.) to control which channels are added to the output and follows instructions from the director. They ensure that the audio is within pre-set limits, typically with the help of peak programme meters and loudness monitors. They relay the information from producers and directors to their A2's (audio assistants) who typically set up the audio cables and equipment throughout the arenas and the booth where the commentators sit. The audio engineer normally also has a dirty feed monitor to help with the synchronization of sound and video. Intercom is also generally the responsibility of the sound department.

Crew

Audio mix engineer (A1) (also known as audio mixer, audio director or sound supervisor) – The A1 mixes the sounds that the audience will listen to. They will mix the assorted sounds such as crowd noise, effect sounds, announcers, etc. They route the different sources of sounds from microphones, cameras, discs, video tapes, telephones, EVS, or outside audio sources, into the audio mixing board for control. They are also in charge of ensuring the audio is successfully being transmitted. They also ensure the intercom is working for every station in the production, as well as dial-up coordination with a network director.
Audio assistant (A2) – The A2s work under the direction of the A1 as they set up all the audio equipment around the venue for various sounds. They also set up the intercom system between the production truck and stage or announcer booths. They are also in charge of placing microphones on the talent as they enter and exit.

Equipment

Audio Mixing console – combine any source of audio and change the level and dynamics of the audio, digital or analog audio sources.
Audio router – used to ensure that all sources of audio appear in the right place on the audio mixing console or in other parts of the production truck
Multitrack recording devices – recording individual tracks of the incoming sources allowing for a dub to be done at a later time
Intercom – two-wire or four-wire intercom allows everyone on the production able to communicate quickly and effectively.

=== VTR ===
The VTR area has a collection of machines including video servers and may also house additional power supplies or computer equipment. The "tape room" has VTR operators who monitor one or more cameras that go into machines and can be played back for replays when an exciting or important play occurs during the game. These operators can play back in slow motion or pause to show a key part of the action. VTR operators also play replay rollouts that lead into commercial breaks, run title sequences and introductory clips, or show the highlights of the event at the end of play.

This area is often called "EVS", after prominent supplier EVS Broadcast Equipment, who make replay machines and associated software.

Crew

Video Tape Operator (also known as LSM Operator or EVS Operator) – The Tape Operators control the recording equipment, nowadays video servers, that receive the video from the various cameras. They coordinate with the Director on playing back pre-recorded video, and other replays of action they recorded.

Equipment

Video server - used to record, store and play back video clips (and sometimes visual effects) used during the broadcast
Video tape recorder – previously used to record, store and play back video

=== Racks / engineering ===
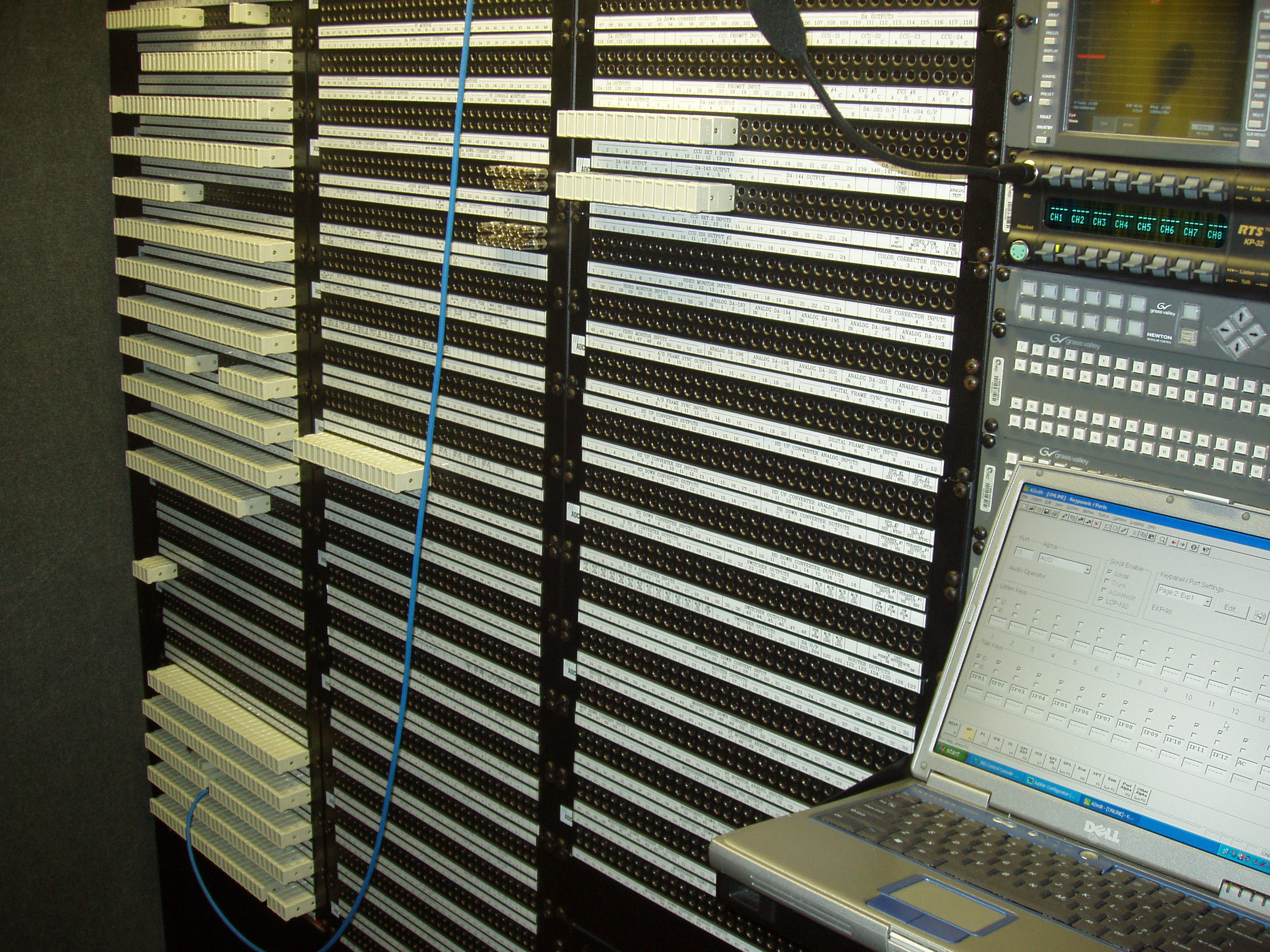
Most production trucks contain a patch panel

In this area, the professional video cameras are controlled using camera control units (CCU) by multiple vision engineers, to make sure that the iris is at the correct level and that all cameras look the same. These operators shade, balance, and focus the cameras from this position inside the vehicle. This area is controlled by an operator called a V1 (vision supervisor in the UK) and depending on the size of the show may have multiple V2s. This area is also where the majority of the racked technical equipment is stored, including the video router and converters.

Crew

Engineer In Charge (EIC) – a broadcast engineer who has a greater deal of knowledge about the truck than anyone else on the production. They are involved in installing all required equipment, having the correct skills needed to fix and maintain the equipment. EIC’s usually stay on one truck for years learning all the intricacies about each machine and how to fix them in difficult situations.
Vision engineer (also known as a video technician or camera shader) – The vision engineers are in charge of all the cameras' iris and overall look of the camera's video. The vision engineers also troubleshoot issues that may arise with the cameras and cable length.

Equipment

Broadcast reference monitor – used to monitor the output of cameras and the transmission for confidence checking
Video router – send video and audio to any destination from any source.
Frame synchronizer – puts Asynchronous or “wild” video sources into Synchronization with other video signals.
Test card Signal generator – used for checking signal paths and troubleshooting.

=== Transmission ===
Some production trucks contain an integrated transmission area, where the outgoing feeds are monitored by the vehicle's engineers to ensure the audience have a good picture and a high-quality signal output. It is then transmitted directly from the truck if it has satellite or fibre uplink facilities, or is sent to other vehicles (typically a dedicated satellite truck) that handle this directly.

== Support Vehicles ==
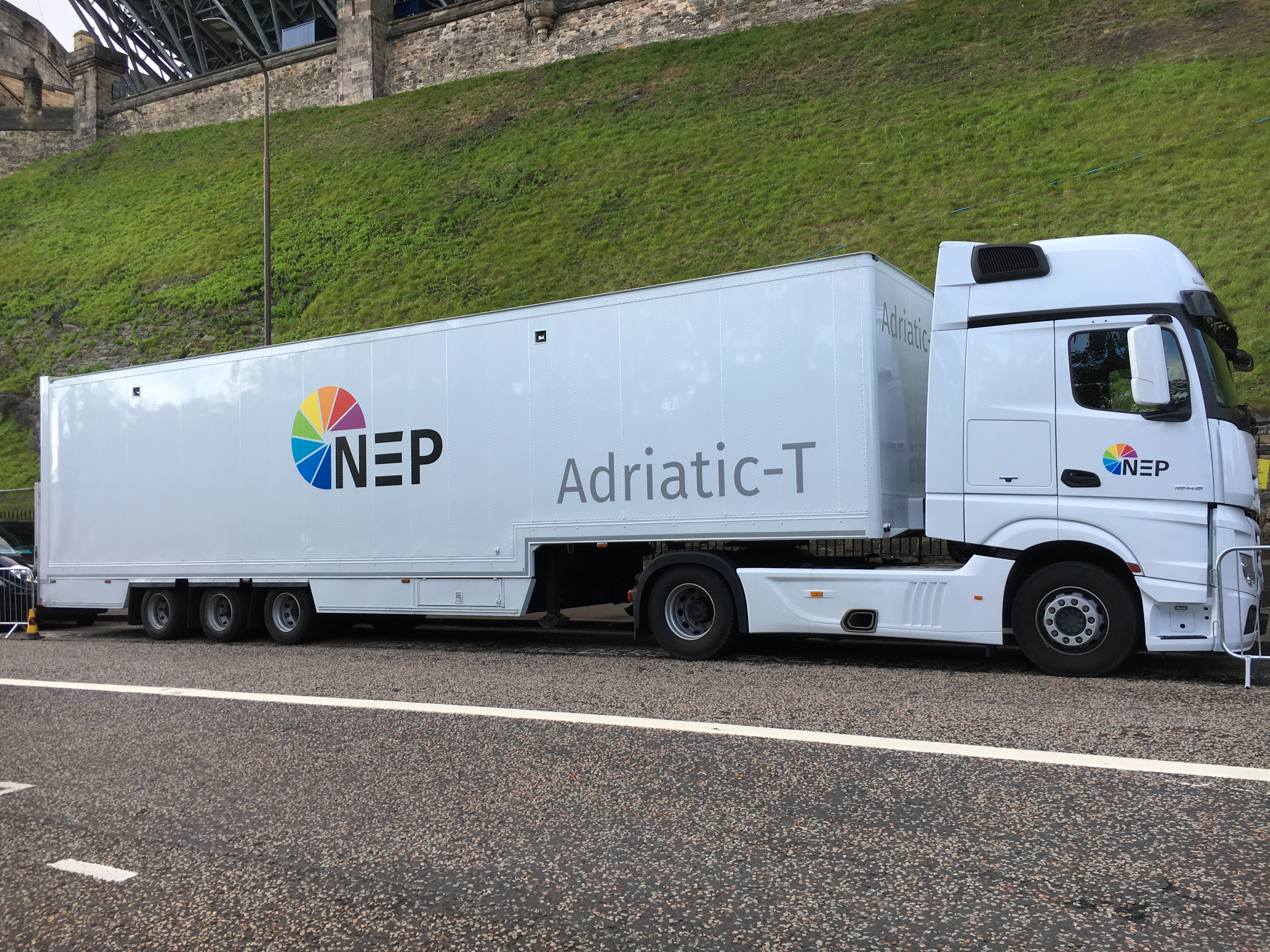
NEP Adriatic-T tender vehicle at Edinburgh Castle

Production trucks can broadcast from most remote locations and are available in platforms ranging from Ford Transit and Sprinter Vans, self-propelled units up to 45', and trailers up to 53'. However, most larger production trucks will travel with a tender vehicle, which will contain additional equipment that cannot be stored in the production truck itself. This equipment includes:

- Camera equipment – Professional video cameras, lenses, tripods, camera pedestals, etc.
- Electrical cables – triaxial cable, coaxial cable, audio multicore cable, XLR audio cables, optical fiber, power cable, etc.
- Sound equipment – a variety of microphones, talkback receivers, etc.

These vehicles will often contain workbenches for basic maintenance and repairs.

== Transmission of video ==
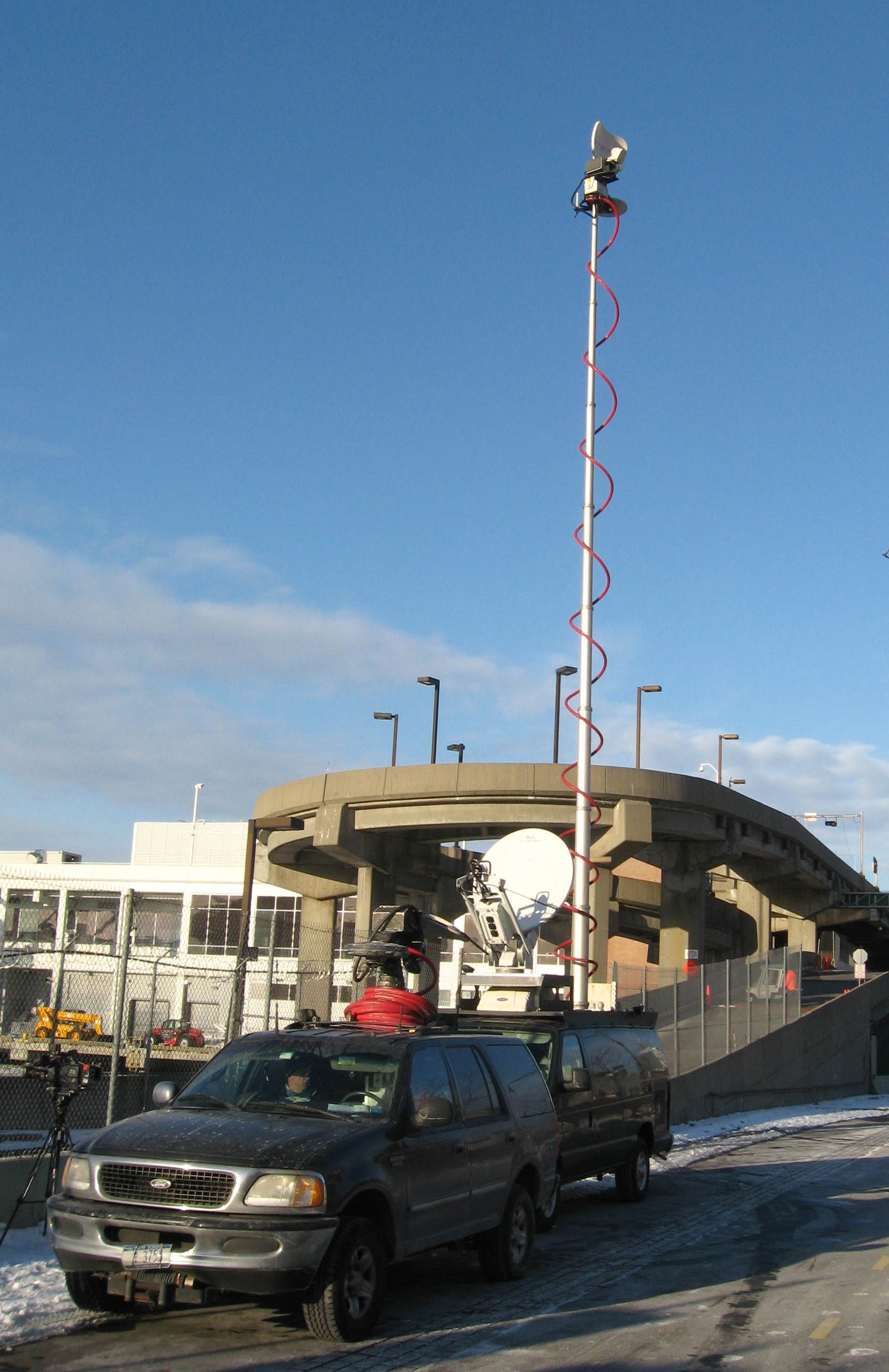
TV news production truck doing a remote broadcast at New York Passenger Ship Terminal. The tall telescoping antenna is pointed at a receiving antenna on the Empire State Building, allowing the truck to send video by microwave link to the production facility.

The transmission of the raw video feed from the remote location to the studio or master control is called backhaul. There are several ways of transmitting the backhaul:

=== Direct microwave link ===
The earliest method, used before satellites, is to beam the video directly back to the studio using a microwave dish, where another dish receives the signal. Microwave transmission requires an unobstructed line-of-sight path from the transmitting to the receiving antenna, which can be difficult to achieve in urban locations. Some production trucks have a small microwave dish mounted on a telescoping mast, that can be raised 30 to 40 feet to "see" over buildings and other obstructions. It is still used for short ranges.

=== Communication satellites ===
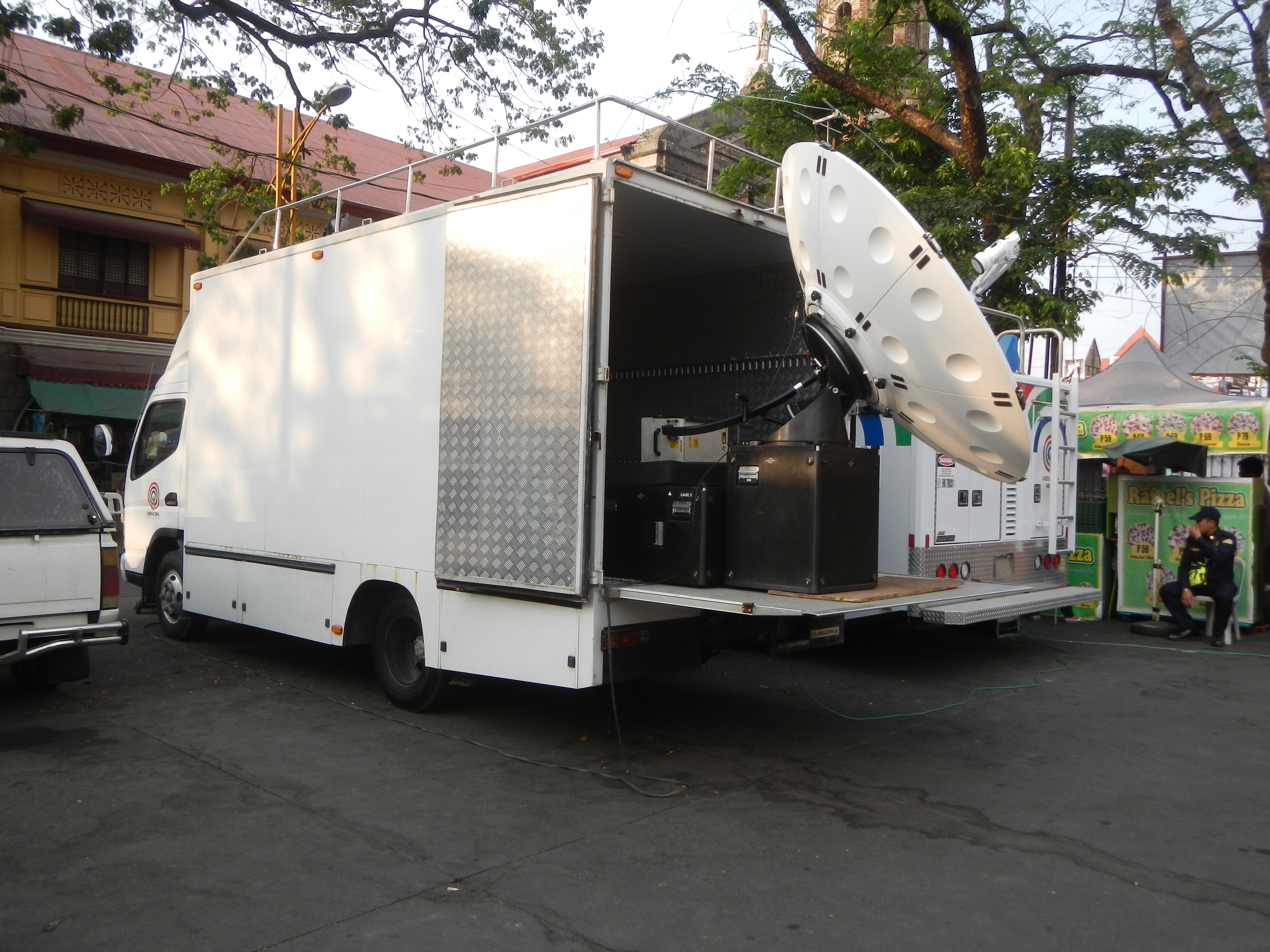
An ABS-CBN satellite truck

One of the most common techniques is to use a satellite dish to transmit the video feed on a microwave uplink signal to a communication satellite orbiting the Earth, which then retransmits it back to a dish at the studio. Satellite feed allows televising live events virtually anywhere on Earth. The satellite is in a geostationary orbit about the Earth and so appears at a stationary position in the sky, so the dish merely has to be pointed initially at the satellite when the truck reaches its remote location and does not have to turn to "track" the satellite. Satellite feed became common in the 1970s when there were enough satellites in orbit that a consumer market for satellite use started in television. This open market for satellite space spawned a flurry in mobile satellite uplink trucks for hire, making possible the television viewing of live events all over the world. The first satellite trucks were allocated frequencies in the C band (5.700-6.500 GHz) which required large 2-meter dishes. In the 1980s frequencies in the K_{u} band (12 to 18 GHz). were authorized, which required only small dishes less than a meter in diameter, but these are not usable in rainy weather because of rain fade.

Today, the satellite dish and microwave transmitter may be on a satellite truck (uplink truck) separate from the production truck, but some production trucks (called "hybrids") also incorporate the satellite dish and transmitter.

=== Fiber optic lines ===
Where available, production trucks can use existing high capacity fiber optic cable to send video directly via the Internet to broadcasting companies for distribution. These accept an asynchronous serial interface (ASI) digital stream from the video encoder. This is a very high quality, low loss way of sending video quickly and securely around the world.

=== Cellular networks ===
Portable, battery-powered, IP video encoders are sometimes used over cellular modems that leverage a technology called bonded cellular, to transmit video signals from a camera back to a control room or content delivery network. There have been recent tests using 5G for backhaul, with fibre optic as backup.
