= Technical director =

Occupation

- Synonyms: TD, technical authority, technical manager

Description
- Fields of employment: Software development, sports, theatre, television, engineering

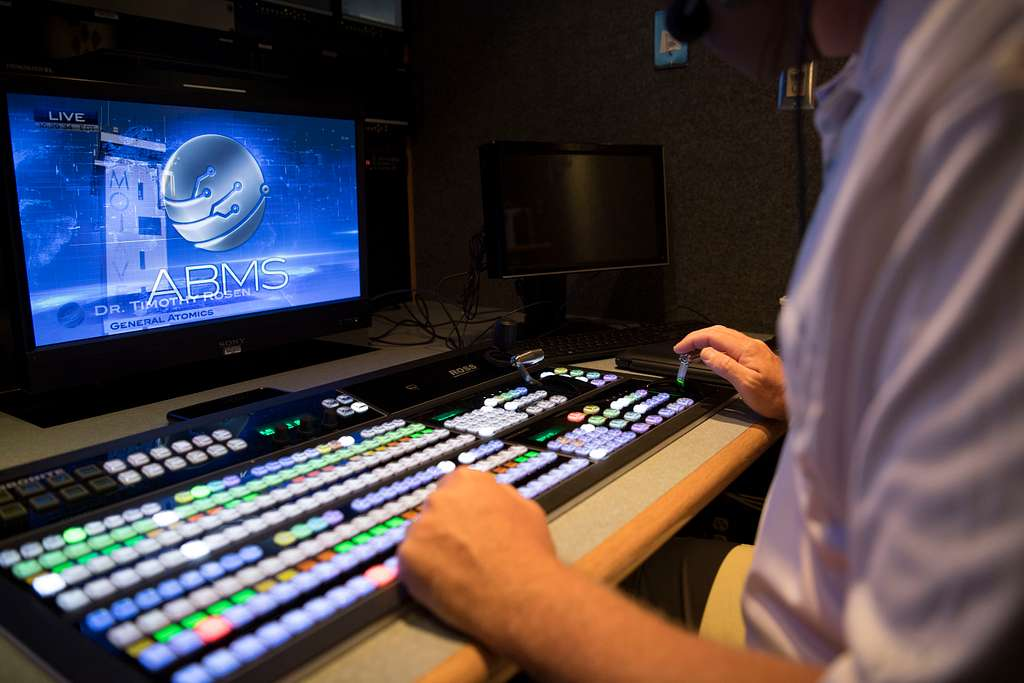
U.S. Air Force Technical Director Burke Baker operating a Ross Video switchboard for the Advanced Battle Management System.

A technical director (TD) is usually a senior technical person responsible for overseeing and coordinating all the technical aspects within the project or organization they are a part of. The title of technical director is used across a wide range of industries such as software development, television and film production, theatre, game development, and live events.

While responsibilities may vary between industries, technical directors in general supervise technical staff and guide the technical processes, while also collaborating with lead roles to ensure that technical aspects align with the overall goal set in place. For example, in theatre and live productions a technical director will work with scenic designers and directors to draft plans, select materials, and prepare the venue for a both safe and efficient production. In television or film technical directors oversee the technical crews and equipment being used, while in software and engineering they will manage the technical pipelines and overall production workflows.

== Software ==
In software development, a Technical Director (TD) is typically responsible for the successful creation, delivery, and implementation of the company's product to the marketplace by managing technical risks and opportunities; making key software design and implementation decisions with the development teams, scheduling of tasks including tracking dependencies, managing change requests, and guaranteeing quality of deliveries and educating the team on technical best practices. They work closely with software developers to ensure timely completion of the project and that it is within the budget. They will also provide high level supervision and technical support to the development teams.

Typical responsibilities:

- Keep track of tech development and relevant regulations related to tech.
- Stay up-to-date on new technologies, provide advice on them, and implement any new tools to improve overall efficiency.
- Supervise development teams and offer technical supervision and guidance.
- Ensures that all technology in use is up-to-date
- Establishes standards and procedures to track and measure project's progression
- Coordinate with different departments to align technical projects and business goals.
- Evaluates interview candidates for technical positions and train employees to use new technologies effectively.
- Write and present technical reports to senior leadership detailing progress, challenges, and recommendations.
- Provide user support and act as an advocate for relaying feed back to the development teams.
- Provides input to the other disciplines on the practicality of initial design goals and impact to the overall project timeline.

== Engineering ==
In the engineering sector, a Technical Director (TD) is often referred to as an engineering manager or technical authority. They hold a senior leadership position and are responsible for the planning, design, and execution of engineering projects. This role bridges the gap between technical teams and organization leadership and plays an important role in making sure that engineering projects and solutions align with overall business objectives. According to Rice University, engineering managers come from technical backgrounds and often are proven engineers before they transition to leadership roles like Technical Director.

Key Responsibilities:

- Plan and manage technical projects from the initial design to its final implementation and ensure that specifications, deadlines, and budgets are being met.
- Ensure regulations and safety standards are being met.
- Resource allocation, ensuring that the right engineers are matched with the right task based on expertise and individual strengths.
- Contribute to business strategy by being a bridge between the technical teams and organization leadership and offering high-level insights that help guide decision-making.
- Lead and mentor engineering teams, which includes hiring, evaluations, and encouraging collaboration and innovation.

== Film ==
In film, animation, and visual effects industries, a Technical Director (TD) is a highly specialized role responsible for technical challenges that arise throughout the production process. TDs work in the middle of art and technology and ensure that things are functioning properly and efficiently. TDs in Film could specialize in scripting tools, building rigging systems, and troubleshooting technical issues. Responsibilities can vary between studios, they can write custom code or develop tools to improve workflow and efficiency. Many TDs use coding languages like C++, Java, and Python and using software like Maya, Houdini, or 3ds Max.

In these industries, "technical artist", "technical animator" and "generalist TD" are sometimes used as synonyms.

=== Categorization of technical directors in film ===
Frequently, the role of a TD is more precisely defined. Various areas of computer graphics require a high degree of specialized technical/scientific knowledge and therefore merit more precise categorization. As an example, a skilled Character TD has a strong understanding of human/animal anatomy, movement, and mechanics, whereas a skilled Lighting TD might have a detailed understanding of the physical properties of light and surfaces.

Those categories include (but are not limited to) the following.

- Effects TD
- Rigging TD
- Lighting TD
- Pipeline TD
- Creature TD or Character TD

== Theatre ==
In theatre, the Technical Director (TD) is responsible for the technical operations in a theatre or any type of performance venue. Their responsibility includes lighting, sound, stage rigging, set design and construction, and coordinating necessary maintenance which additionally means following safety standards.

It is a technical director's job to make sure the technical equipment in the theater is functional, maintained, and safe. The technical director, along with the production manager, is responsible for the overall organization of the technical production process. Duties included are generating necessary working drawings for construction (in conjunction with a drafts-person, if there is one); budget estimations and maintaining of accounts; materials research and purchasing; scheduling and supervising build crews; coordinating load-ins; handling conflicts that arise between different departments; and organizing the strike and clean-up for the production. Often, the Technical Director can serve as the head of the scenic department, supervising the master carpenter, carpenters, charge artists and leading them in the realization of the scenic designer's vision.

Key responsibilities of a theatre technical director can include:

- Advise production managers, scenic, lighting, and sound designers about technical specifications, cost, and the implementation of designs.
- Oversee the use, maintenance, and safety of technical equipment such as lights, sounds, and rigging systems.
- Monitor inventory, manage technical budgets, and facilitate any maintenance or repair of equipment.
- Design, set up, maintain, and operate lighting and sound systems.
- Coordinate stage construction and supervise during set building and strikes.

In venues that host touring productions, the TD may also be responsible for advancing the technical rider, hiring local crew, renting equipment and liaising between the tour manager and the local crew.

Technical directors in theatre are expected to possess a wide range of technical knowledge in different disciplines such as carpentry, sound design, lighting, stage management, dance, music, and the methods and procedures of theatre. Additionally, they are expected to communicate effectively and work closely with artistic and technical teams.

== Television ==
In television, the Technical Director (TD) plays an important role in ensuring smooth, high-quality broadcasts. They are typically positioned in a control room, and the technical director operates the video and audio elements. Based on cues from the director, they select camera angles, graphics, and video feeds. It's the TD's job to ensure that "broadcast quality" is maintained at all times.

During live productions, the Technical Director is responsible for transitioning between video shots, overlaying graphics, and ensuring that audio and visuals are synchronized. According to NBCU Academy, technical directors are also responsible for managing the technical crew and coordinating with them, making split-second decisions during live broadcasts.

In the USA, the technical director works in a production control room of a television studio and operates the video switcher and associated devices as well as serving as the chief of the television crew. For a remote broadcast outside the studio, the TD will perform the same duties in a mobile production truck. It is the TD's job to ensure all positions are staffed and all equipment and facilities are checked out and ready before the recording session or live broadcast begins. They typically will switch video sources, perform live digital effects and transitions, and insert pre-recorded material, graphics, and titles as instructed by the Television director. In larger productions, the director does not actually operate the production equipment, allowing them to coordinate the production and make rapid decisions without worrying about how to mechanically execute the effect or camera move being called for. The technical director may provide training to more inexperienced members of the technical crew when needed. In consultation with the director, the TD may have more or less input into the creative side of the production, depending on the situation. They may provide the director with guidance on crew assignments, camera shots and the most efficient way to accomplish any given effect. The TD is usually responsible for the technical quality of the signal being recorded or broadcast and will use various measuring devices and displays to ensure quality control.

Technical directors commonly work on productions that are either broadcast live or recorded on videotape or video servers. Television productions shot on film generally do not use TDs, as the camera cuts and effects are realized in post-production after the shooting is completed.

The terminology in most areas outside the USA differs in some respects from the above description: The production control room is called a "gallery", a mobile production truck is called an "OB van" or a "scanner" (a BBC term). In UK television practice, the technical director is the senior technical person in the gallery and supervises the technical team, but does not operate the "vision mixer". The TD is responsible for ensuring that the gallery is technically fit for purpose, the routing of internal and external sources, as well as liaison with other technical areas such as master control rooms and transmission suites. They may additionally perform vision control duties, matching the exposure and colour balance of the cameras ("racking").

== See also ==
- Chief technology officer
