= Transmission control room =

Room found at broadcast facilities and television stations

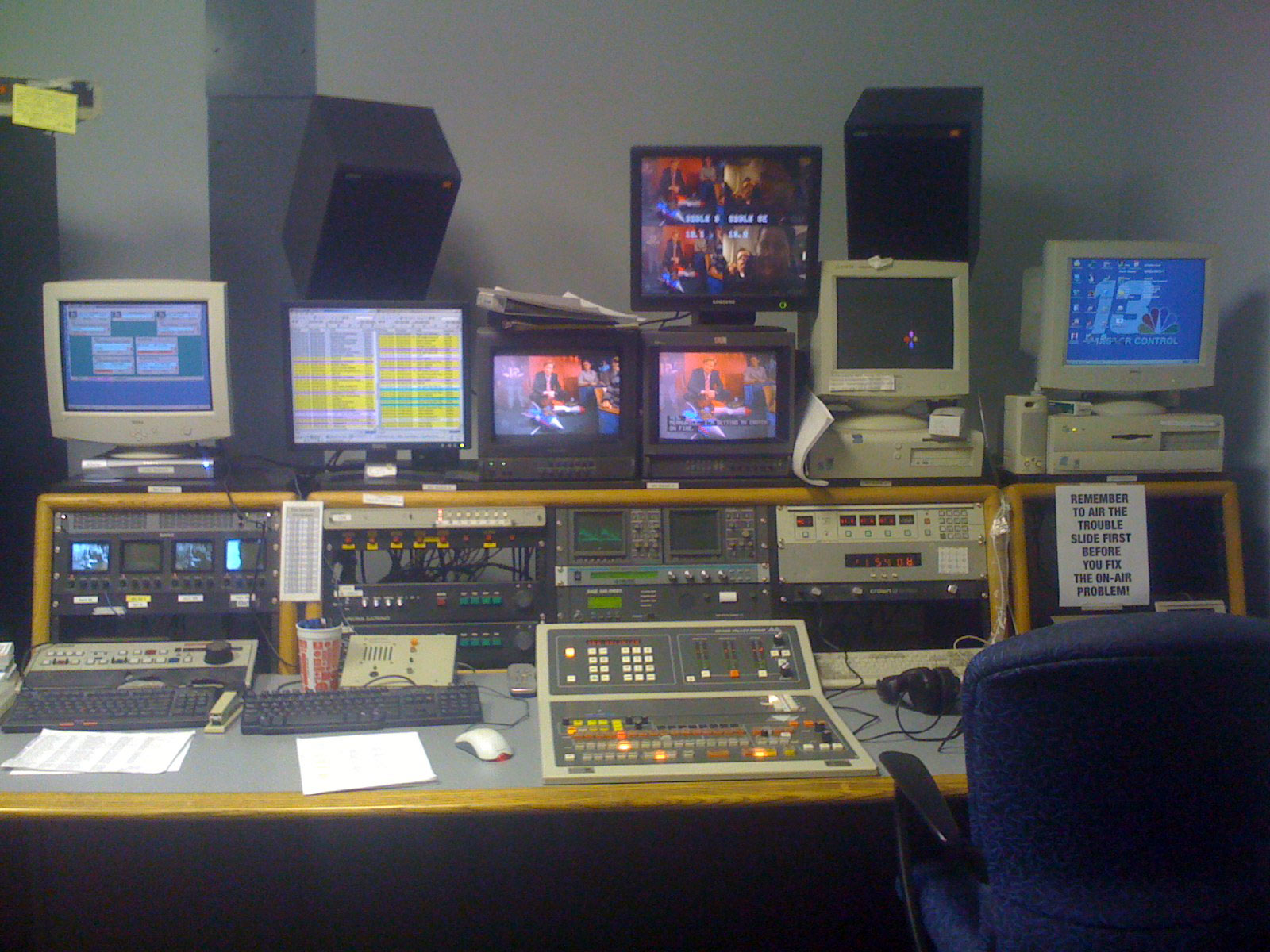
WREX-TV's master control desk in the TCR

A transmission control room (TCR), transmission suite, Tx room, or presentation suite is a room at broadcast facilities and television stations around the world. Compared to a master control room, it is usually smaller in size and is a scaled-down version of centralcasting. A TX room or presentation suite will be staffed 24/7 by presentation directors and tape operators and will be fitted out with video play-out systems often using server-based broadcast automation.

For operational and content qualitative reasons, not more than two television channels are managed from one TCR. Channels with live content and production switching requirements like sports channels have their own dedicated TCRs. A television station may have several TCRs depending on the number of channels they broadcast.

== Presentation suite ==
The presentation suite is staffed 24/7 by on-air presentation directors who are responsible for the continuity and punctuality playout of scheduled broadcast programming. Programming may be live from the television studio or played from video tape or from video server playout. When broadcast programming is 'live' the presentation coordinator will override the broadcast automation system and manually switch television programming. The presentation director (PD) will directly coordinate live television programming going to air in consultation with master control and the production assistant (PA) or the director's assistant (DA). The presentation director will arrange program sources to be allocated by master control and advise the DA as to the start time and count the production in from 10 seconds to first-frame of picture and the DA will count the production out to the television commercial break and so on it continues to the end of the program. Live programming is unpredictable and will affect the scheduled timing of scheduled programming events; the PD adjusts programming to bring the schedule back on time by adding or removing fill content from the playout schedule. The presentation director is also responsible for enacting emergency procedures in the event of a channel breakdown.

== Common TCR equipment ==
- Broadcast control desk
- Broadcast automation control computers
- Production switcher
- Talkback (recording)
- Broadcast quality video monitor
- Waveform monitor
- SDI audio de-embedder
- Video playout automation
- Character generator (CG) titles generator
- Emergency Alert System encoding/decoding systems

== See also ==
- Master control room
- Central apparatus room
- Broadcast engineering
