= VTG =

VTG or Vtg may refer to:

- Vitellogenin (VTG) a type of protein
- Variable turbine geometry, in variable-geometry turbochargers
- Airline code for Aviação Transportes Aéreos e Cargas, Angola
- Virtual tributary group, in synchronous optical networking
- An airport code for Vung Tau Airport, Vietnam
- Victoria Tower Gardens, a park in London

== See also ==
- VTG-32, a type of video timer produced by FOR-A
- VT Group, a privately held United States defense and services company
