= Clean feed (television) =

Video signal without added graphics and text

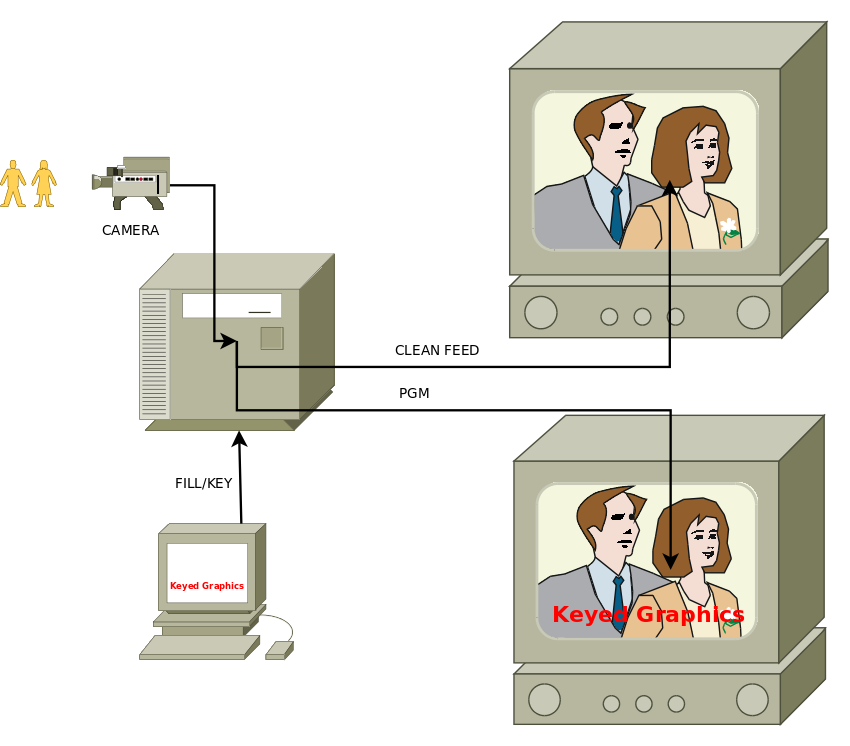
Generation of both Program and Clean Feed. The clean signal has no graphics keyed over it.

In television technology, a clean feed is a video signal that does not have added graphics and text. This video signal is used in sport production to allow different television stations to add their own digital on-screen graphic image on a common signal, or in news broadcasting to produce two or more different streams, each one with the same picture but in different languages.

A clean feed is a signal which has not come from the main output of the video switcher, such as the output of a vision mixer before the downstream keyer stage - the clean feed is identical to the main program output but without any captions keyed into it. Modern production equipment can actually put different keys on multiple outputs, allowing them to go to the clean feed or not. The most sophisticated vision mixers (or production switchers, according to the American nomenclature) can generate a clean feed output for any of their mix/effects (ME) buses.

The term clean feed is also used to refer to backhaul feeds of television programming sent via communication satellite or other transport (such as a national fiber-optic network) sent from another TV station or remote television production truck on-location, which does not carry any television advertisements or break bumpers, or in some cases, lower-third graphics or superimposed chyron text. Similarly, in Australian television, a dirty feed often refers to a regional television station taking the feed of its affiliate without inserting local advertisements or branding.

== See also ==
- Mix-minus
