= Talkback (recording) =

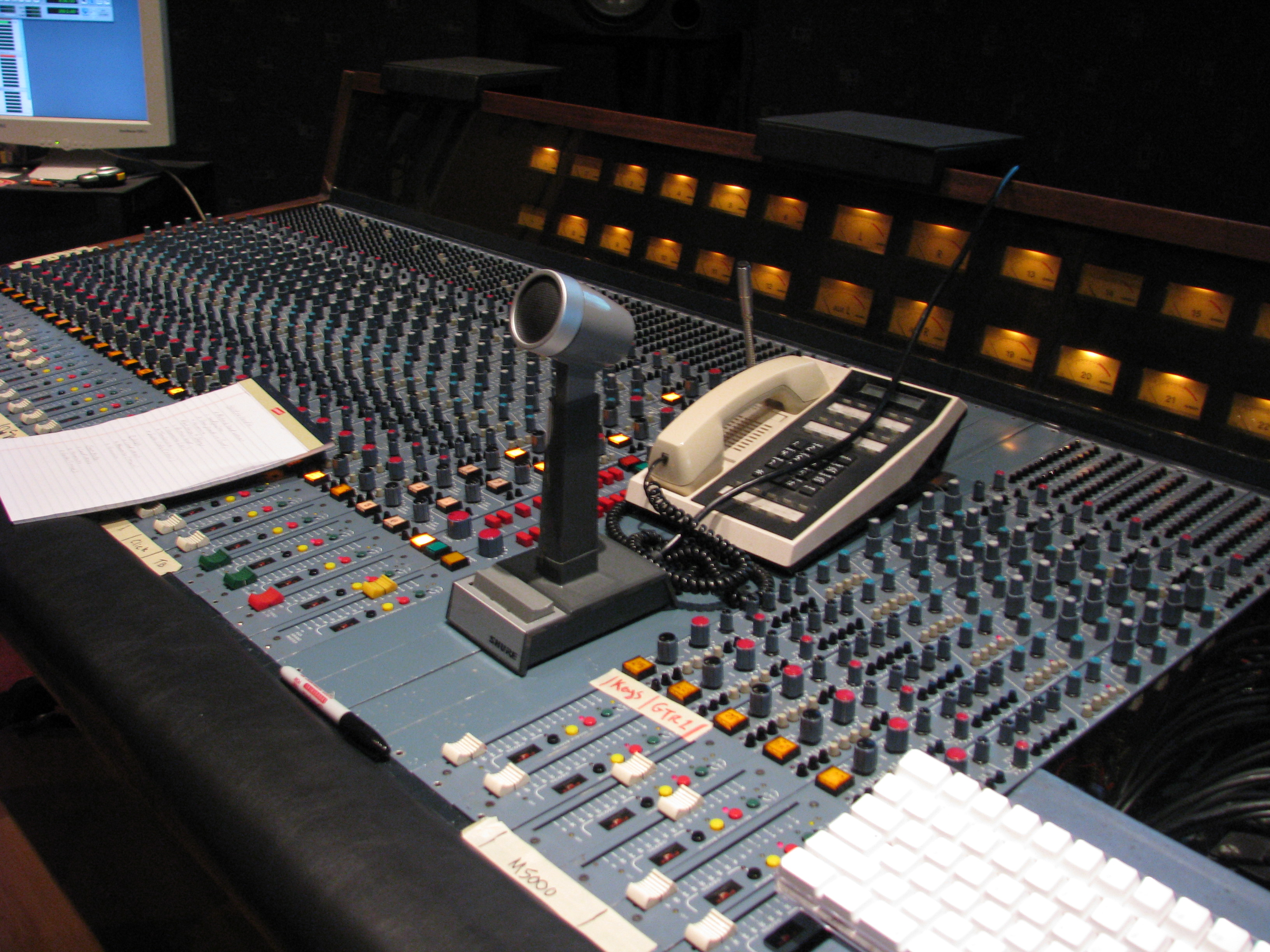
A talkback microphone in a recording studio

In sound recording, a talkback system is the intercom used in recording studios and production control rooms (PCRs) in television studios to enable personnel to communicate with people in the recording area or booth. While the control room can hear the person in the booth over the studio microphones, the person in the booth hears the control room over a PA, monitor speaker, in their headphones or interruptible feedback (IFB) earpiece. Take numbers, reference data, and sometimes count-ins or remarks are also "stamped" onto recordings through talkback, similar to a clapperboard.
