= Production control room =

Part of a television studio

Production control room at PTV Davao in Mindanao Media Hub, Diversion Road, Bangkal, Davao City, Philippines.

The production control room (PCR) or studio control room (SCR) is the area in a television studio in which the configuration of the outgoing program takes place.

The production control room is occasionally also called an SCR, or, in British English, a gallery – the latter name comes from the original placement of the director on an ornately carved bridge spanning the BBC's first television studio at Alexandra Palace which was once referred to as like a minstrels' gallery. Master control is the technical hub of a broadcast operation common among most over-the-air television stations and television networks. Master control is distinct from a PCR in television studios where the activities such as switching from camera to camera are coordinated. A transmission control room (TCR) is usually smaller in size and is a scaled-down version of centralcasting.

== Production control room facilities ==
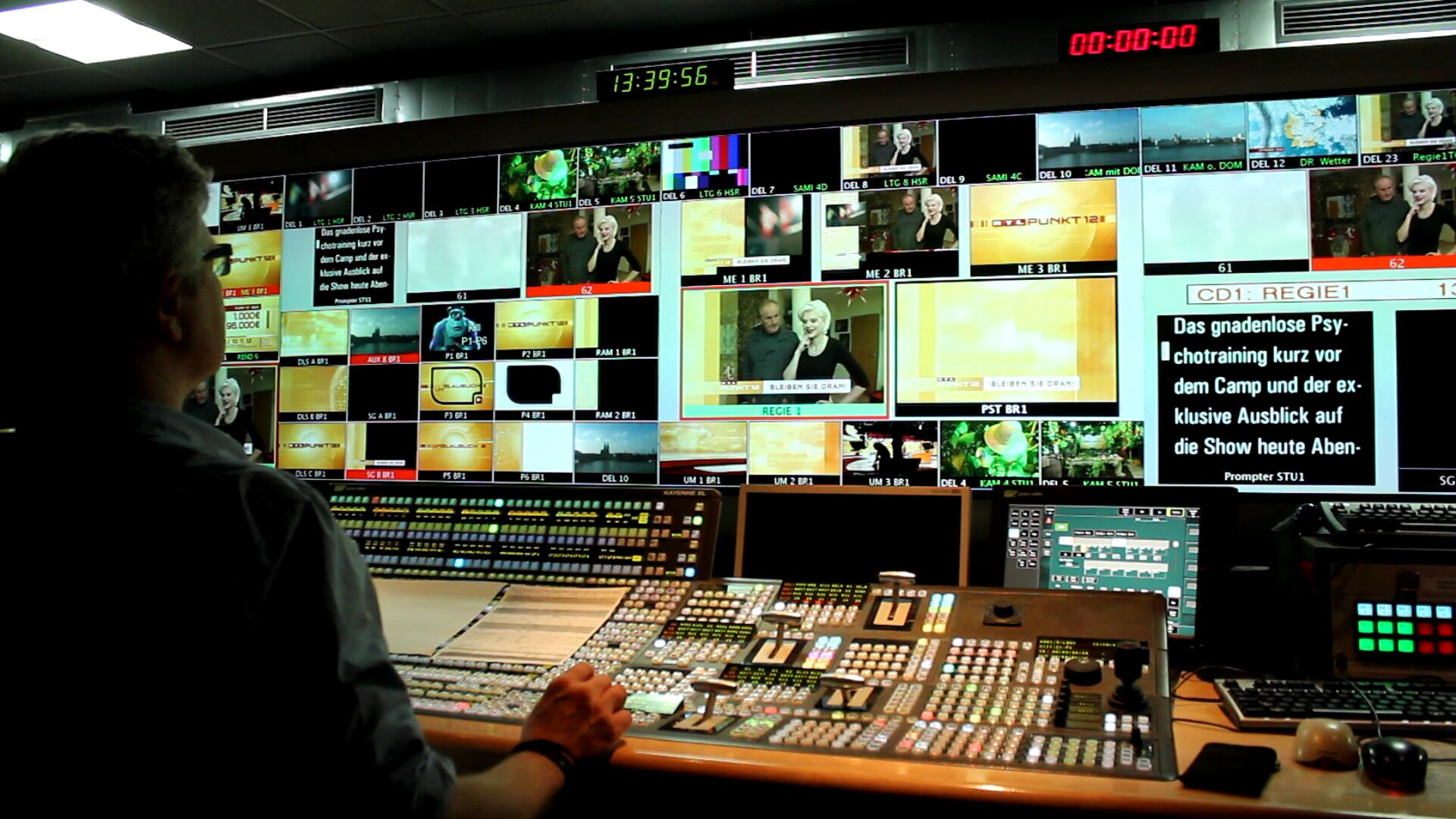
A virtual monitor wall in a PCR at Germany's RTL

Facilities in a production control room include:

- A video monitor wall, with monitors for program, preview, VTRs, cameras, graphics and other video sources. In some facilities, the monitor wall is a series of racks containing physical television and computer monitors; in others, the monitor wall has been replaced with a virtual monitor wall (sometimes called a "glass cockpit"), one or more large video screens or video walls, each capable of displaying multiple sources in a simulation of a monitor wall.
- A vision mixer, a large control panel used to select the multiple-camera setup and other various sources to be recorded or seen on air and, in many cases, in any video monitors on the set. The term "vision mixer" is primarily used in Europe, while the term "video switcher" is usually used in North America.
- A professional audio mixing console and other audio equipment such as audio effect units or devices.
- A character generator (CG), which creates the majority of the names and full digital on-screen graphics that are inserted into the program lower third portion of the television screen.
- Digital video effects, or DVE, for manipulation of video sources. In newer vision mixers, the DVE is integrated into the vision mixer; older models without built-in DVEs can often control external DVE devices, or an external DVE can be manually run by an operator.
- Hard drive or SSD docking stations or memory card readers.
- A still store, or still frame, device for storage of graphics or other images. While the name suggests that the device is only capable of storing still images, newer still stores can store moving video clips and motion graphics. It may also be integrated into the vision mixer.
- The technical director's station, with waveform monitors, vectorscopes and the camera control units (CCU) or remote control panels (RCPs) for the CCUs which are used to control the professional video cameras in the studio floor
- In many facilities, a lighting control console used to control the lighting on the studio floor
- In some facilities, VTRs, VCRs, CCUs, video servers and video and audio converters, processors and routers may also be located in the PCR, but are also often found in the central apparatus room (CAR).
- Intercom and IFB equipment for communication with talent and television crew.
- A signal generator to genlock all of the video equipment to a common reference that requires a color burst.

== Gallery ==
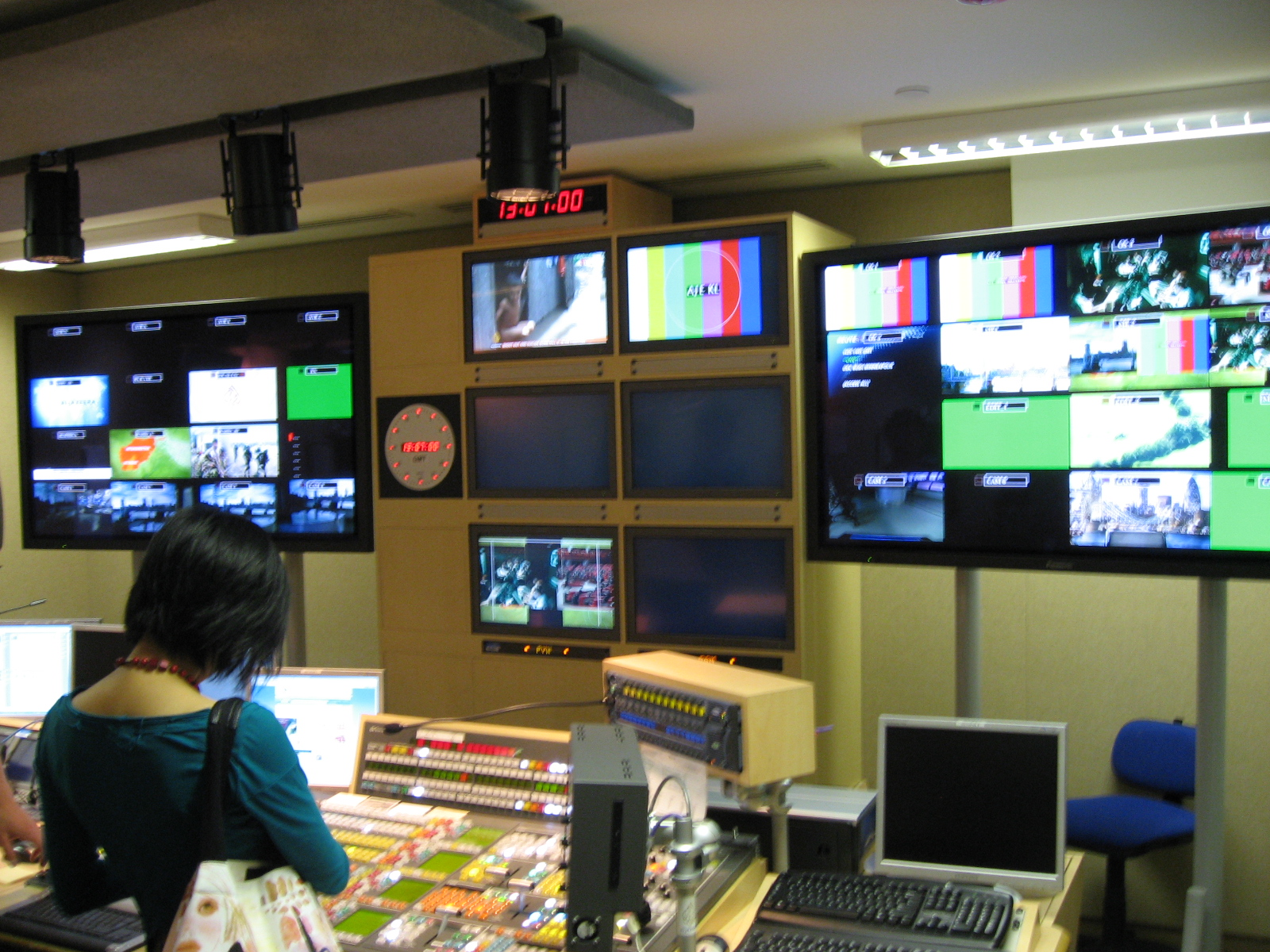
The Al Jazeera English studio control room under construction in London, United Kingdom (August 2007).

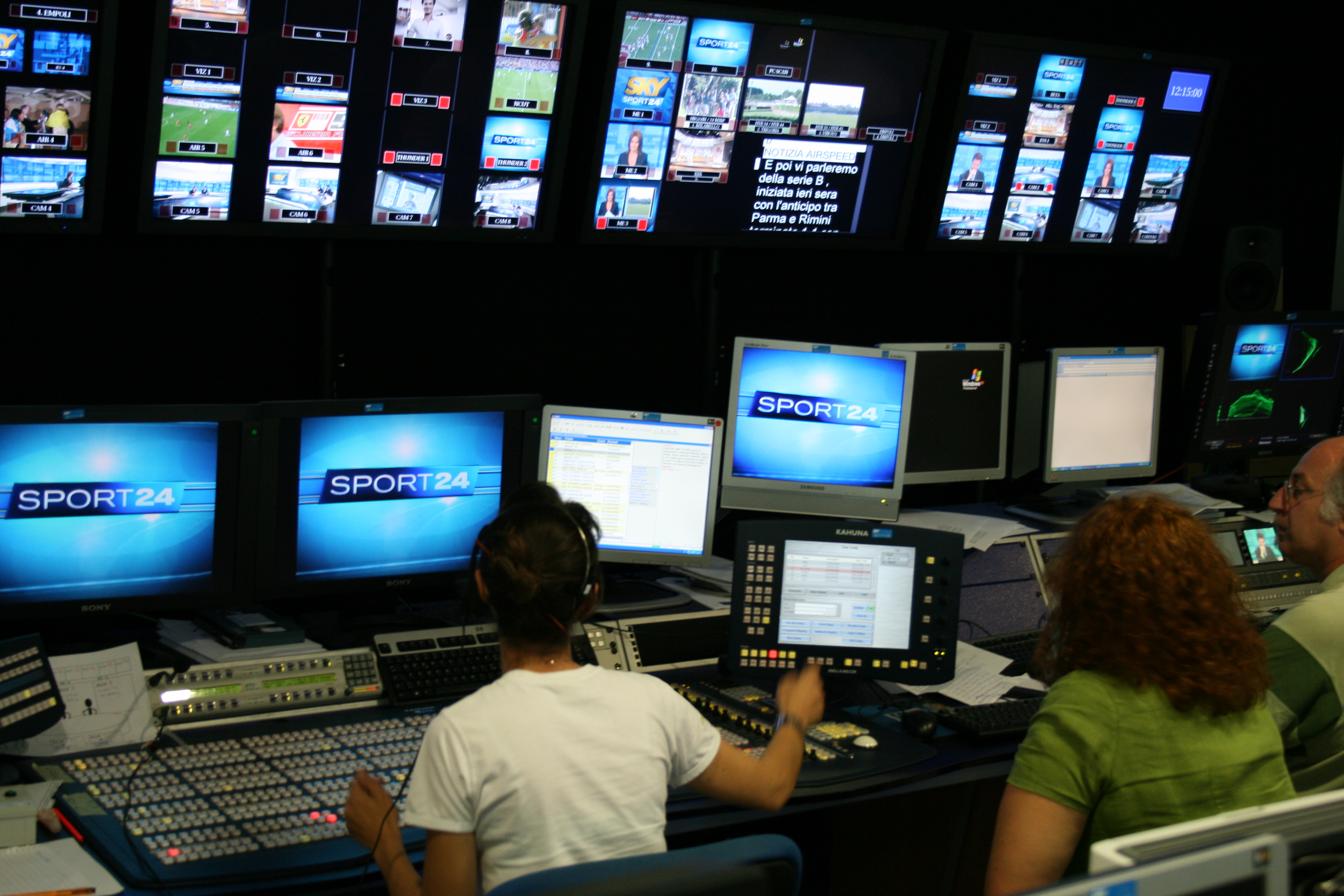
The production control room for Sky Italia's news channel Sky Sport24 (August 2008).

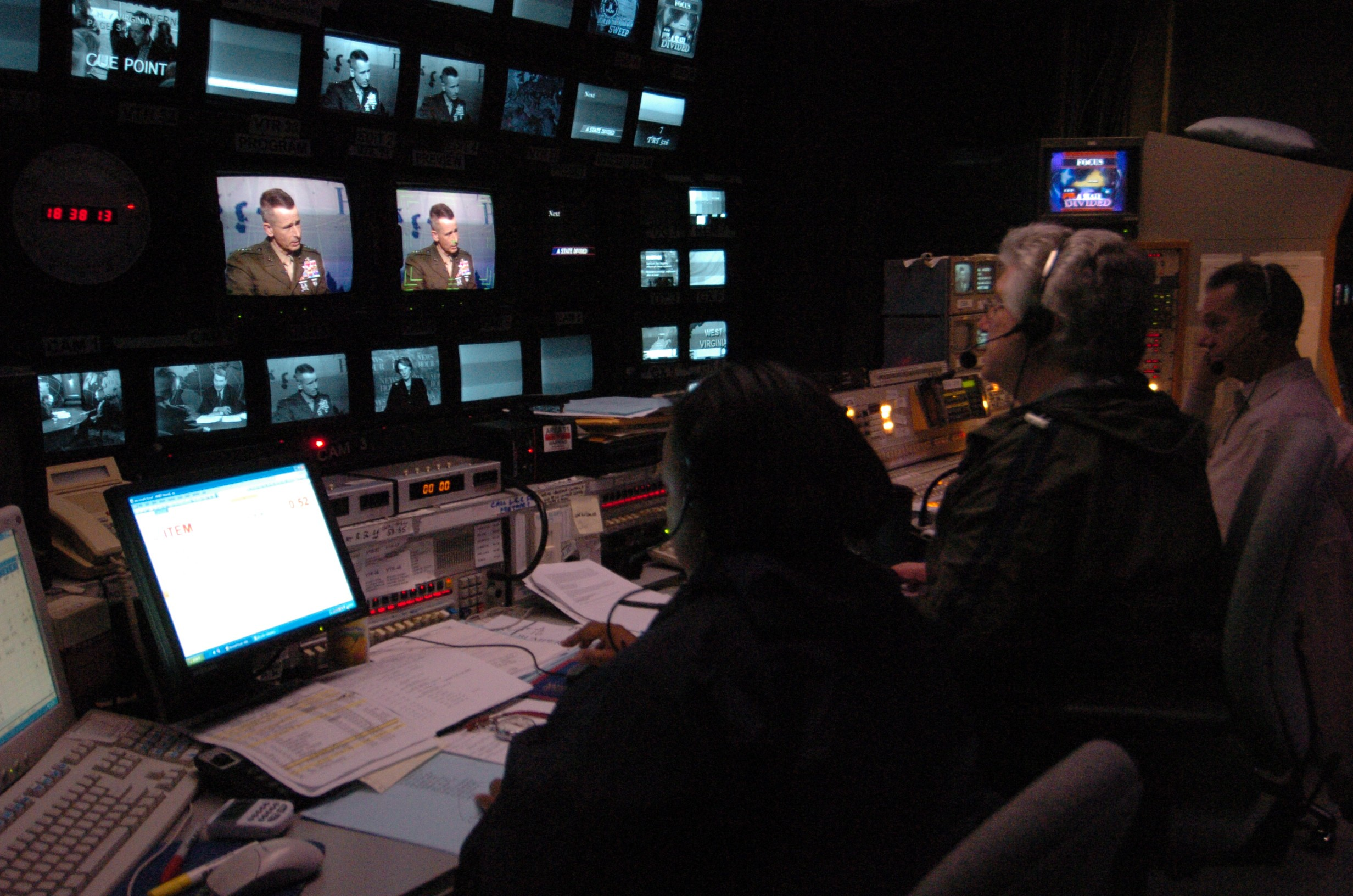
The production control room for The NewsHour with Jim Lehrer during an interview with General Peter Pace (November 7, 2005).

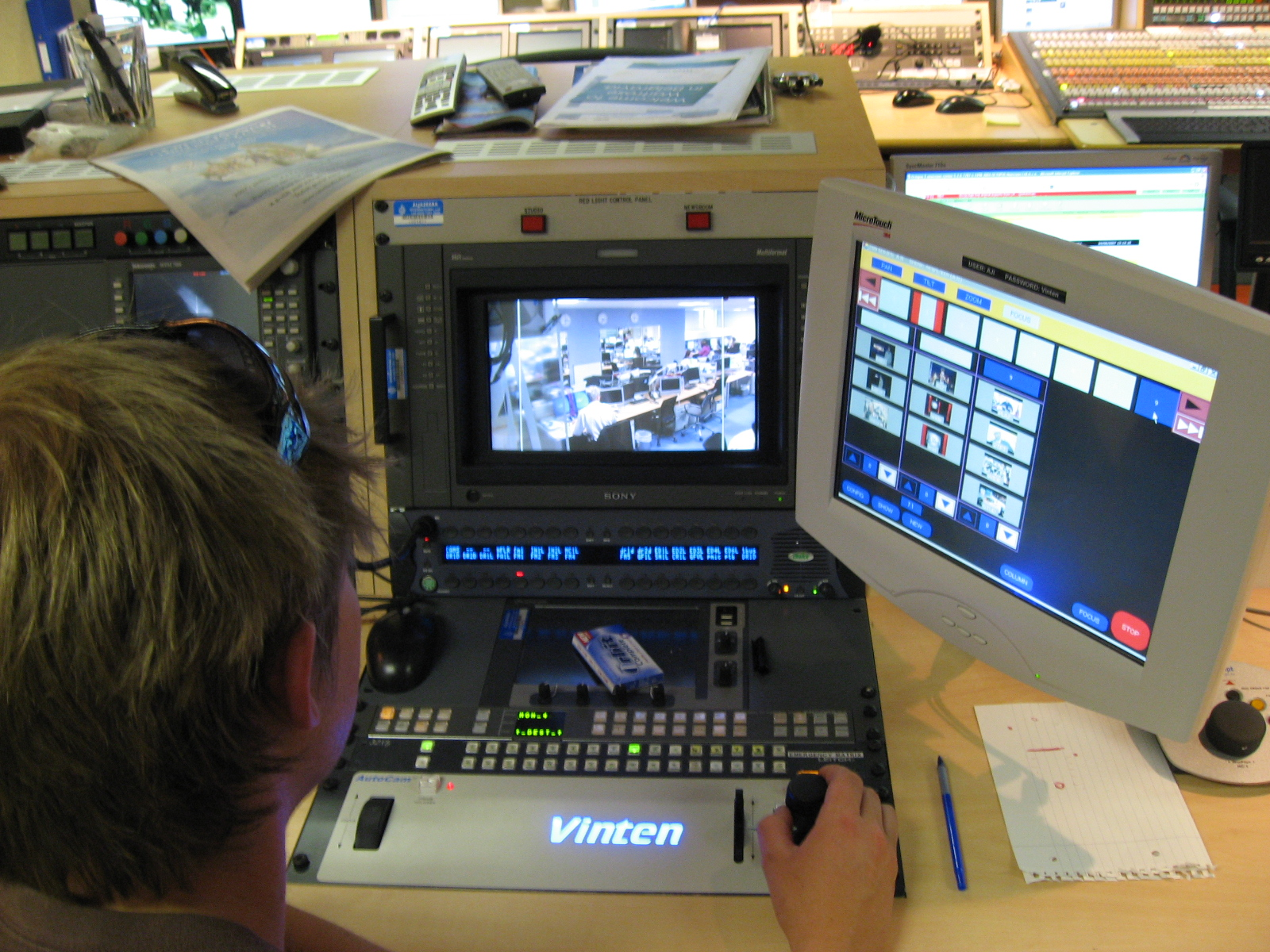
A Vinten remote pan tilt zoom camera controller at the Al Jazeera studios in London, United Kingdom (August 2007).

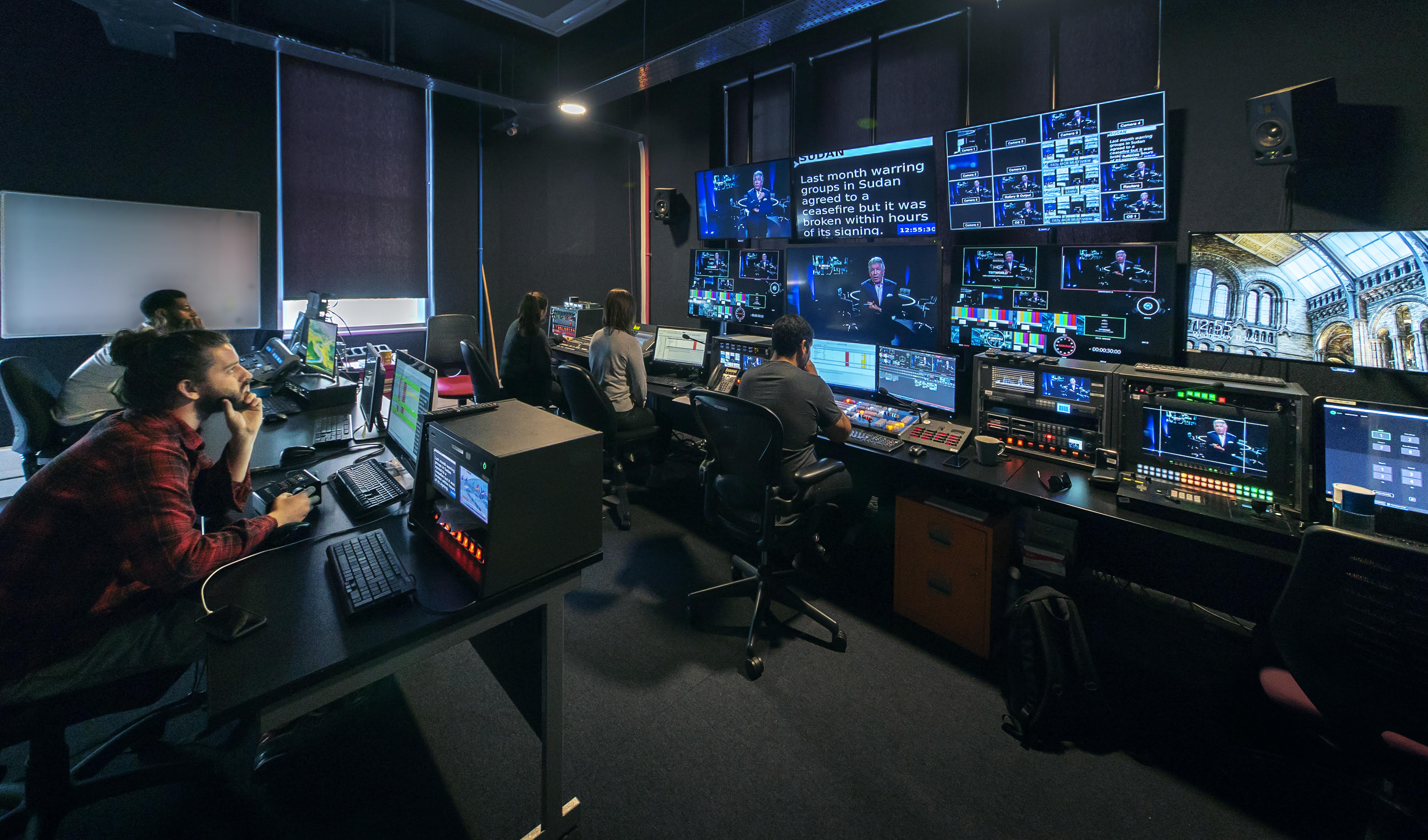
The production control room at Celebro Studios in London, United Kingdom (June 2019).

The production control room at PTV Davao in Mindanao Media Hub, Diversion Road, Bangkal, Davao City, Philippines (November 2021).

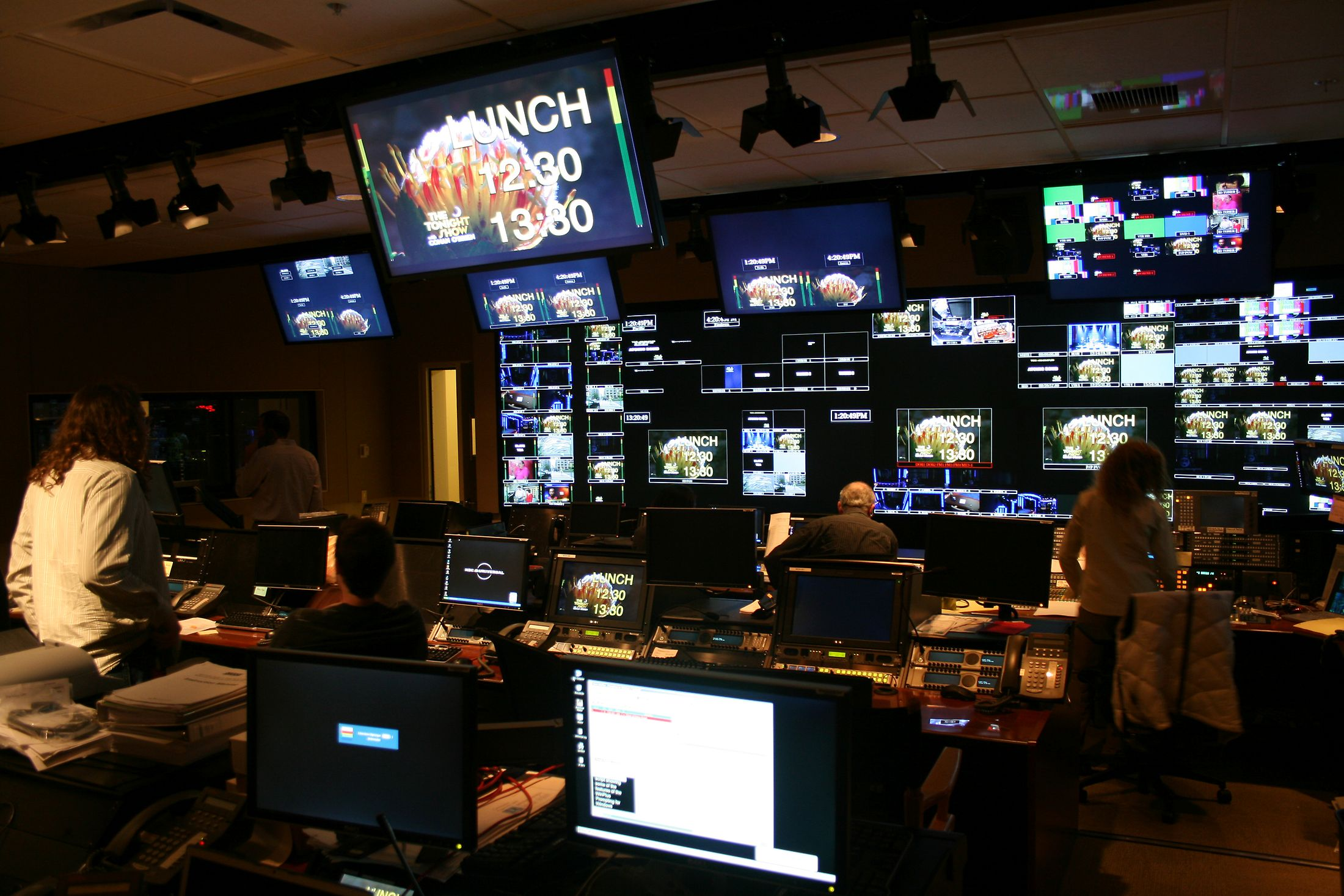
Production control room of a late-night talk show, The Tonight Show with Conan O'Brien (2009).

== See also ==
- Broadcast engineering
- Engineering technician
- Master control room (MCR)
- Central apparatus room (CAR)
- Technical operator
