= Audio router =

An audio router is a device that transports audio signals from inputs to outputs.

== Inputs and Outputs ==
The number of inputs and outputs varies dramatically. The way routers are described is normally number of inputs by number of outputs e.g. 2×1, 256×256.

== Signals ==
The transported audio can be analog or digital. Digital audio usually is in the AES/EBU standard for broadcast use. Broadband routers can route more than one signal type e.g. analogue or more than one type of digital.

== Crosspoints ==
Because any of the inputs can be routed to any output, the internal arrangement of the router is arranged as a number of crosspoints which can be activated to pass the corresponding signal to the desired output.

== Some Manufacturers of audio routers ==
- Lawo
- Datavideo
- Imagine Communications
- AEQ
- FOR-A
- Klotz Digital
- NVISION
- Panasonic
- Philips
- Ross Video
- Snell & Wilcox
- Sony
- Thomson Grass Valley
- Utah Scientific
- Matrix Switch Corporation

== See also ==
- Video router
- Vision mixer
