= FOR-A =

Professional broadcast video and audio equipment

FOR-A Company Limited 株式会社朋栄
- Type: Private
- Industry: Video and Audio Technology for Broadcast and Film
- Founded: 21 October 1971
- Headquarters: Tokyo, Japan
- Key people: Keizo Kiyohara, President and Founder
- Products: Video switchers Virtual studios Frame synchronizers Multi-Viewers
- Number of employees: 200 (500 total within FOR-A Group)
- Website: www.for-a.com

FOR-A Company Limited (株式会社朋栄, Kabushikigaisha Hōei) is a Japanese manufacturer of professional broadcast video and audio equipment. Founded in 1971, FOR-A has spread globally, with subsidiaries in America, Canada, Korea, Italy, United Kingdom, India, Hong Kong, Middle East and Africa.

FOR-A manufactures 4K variable-rate, slow-motion digital video cameras, digital video switchers, signal processing equipment, broadcast graphics products (such as virtual processors and studios), multi-viewers, frame synchronizers and time base correctors, HD/SD converters, and video stabilizers.

== History ==
FOR-A was established on October 21, 1971, by Keizo Kiyohara in Tokyo, Japan. Its first product was the VTG-32, a worldwide video timer, which allowed for the establishment of FOR-A Corporation of America in California. In 1977, after producing the FVW-900 (a video writer), the company went on to manufacture the FA-410P, a time-based corrector. From there, FOR-A went on to open locations in Canada, England, Italy, China, and Korea. By the 1990s, FOR-A was a leading developer of DVE manipulation units, character generators, Time Base correctors, and Frame Rate Converters. In 1994, their character generator (the VWS-100) was chosen for official production display use at the Nagano Olympic Games. FOR-A recently also developed the instant replay and mark entry used by the International Skating Union at all major figure skating events, including the Olympics.

== Company Timeline ==
1970 – VTG-32 produced.
1974 – FOR-A Corporation of America established in California.
1977 – FVW-900 produced, a video writer allowing for freehand drawing on the screen.
1981 – FA-410 Produced, widely considered the best TBC on the market at that time.
1985 – FOR-A Research and Development Center opened in Sakura City, Chiba.
1986 – First DVE Manipulation Unit Produced
1988 – FOR-A Corporation of Canada established in Toronto.
1989 – Sakura R&D Center Expansion Completed
1991 – R&D Center opened in Sapporo City, Hokkaido.
1992 – Video Gainesville Inc. (Florida, USA) acquired to establish overseas development center and expand production.
1993 – VWS-100 selected for official production display use at Nagano Olympic Games
1994 - PC board assembly factory opened at Sakura R&D Center.
1995 - FOR-A (UK) Limited established in London (England).
1996 - FOR-A Italia S.r.l. established in Milan (Italy).
1997 - digiWarp designed to add virtual studio systems to product lineup.
1998 - Headquarters moved to Ebisu in Shibuya-ku, Tokyo (Japan).
1998 - Extension expansion of Sakura R&D Center completed.
1999 - 24-hour, 365-day FOR-A service call center established for Japanese market.
2001 - ISO certification of Sakura R&D Center successfully completed.

HD and SD versions of HVS-3000 (2M/E Digital Video Switcher) Debuts to acclaim at IBC2001.
New headquarters building completed in Ebisu in Shibuya-ku, Tokyo (Japan).
Special camera related sales and development center completed on Sakura R&D grounds.

2004 - FOR-A Corporation of Korea established in Seoul.
2010 - Introduced LTR-100HS Video Archive Recorder with LTO-5 and LTFS at NAB trade show (NAB-2010)

== Associated Companies ==
- FOR-A Corporation of America
- FOR-A Latin America, Incorporated
- FOR-A Corporation of Canada
- FOR-A UK Limited
- FOR-A Italia S.r.l
- FOR-A Corporation of Korea
- EXA International Co., Ltd.
- FOR-A MFG. Co., Ltd.
- FOR-A System Service Co., Ltd.
- WIZ Co., Ltd.
- Towa Air Transport System Ltd.
- FOR-A KIKAKU Co., Ltd.
- VIF Co., Ltd.
- Idea Institute Inc.
- Vanguard International Foods Co., Ltd.

== Trivia ==
The company name, "FOR-A", is derivative of a similar—sounding Japanese phrase ("Han'ei") meaning "Prosperity with friends".
