= Video router =

Device used to direct video from input sources like cameras to displays like projectors

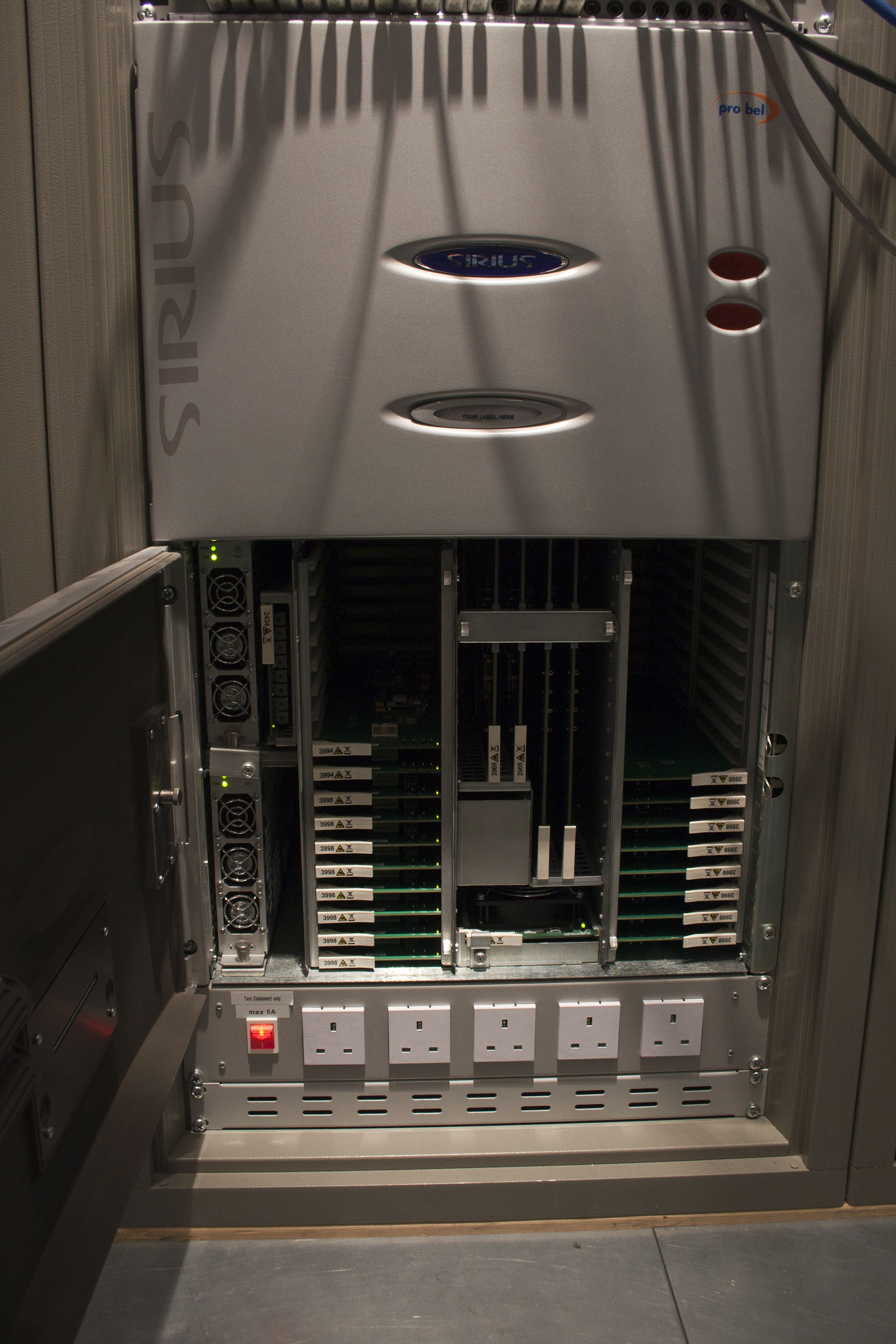
Two video matrix units in a rack.

A video router, also known as a video matrix switch or SDI router, is an electronic switch designed to route video signals from multiple input sources such as cameras, VT/DDR, computers and DVD players, to one or more display devices, such as monitors, projectors, and TVs.

== Inputs and outputs ==
The number of inputs and outputs varies dramatically. Routers are normally described by a number of inputs by number of outputs e.g. 2 × 1, 256 × 256, 576 × 1152. Some video routers, by the use of additional drop-in cards, allow the system to be expanded for more inputs or outputs, or to support other formats.

== Signals ==
The signal format that the router transports can be anything from analogue composite video using PAL and NTSC. Also multi-format routers can route more than one Digital video signal format, serial digital interface (SDI), HD-SDI, component video. Some routers have the ability to internally convert digital to analog and analog to digital. For HD Video, HDMI Matrix switch can be used to switch any HDMI source to any connected HDTV using a HDMI connection.

More recent developments have allowed audio embedding and de-embedding within the router, this allows for audio to be routed along with video.

== Crosspoints ==
Because any of the sources can be routed to any destination, the internal arrangement of the router is arranged as a number of crosspoints which can be activated to pass the corresponding source signal to the desired destination. This architecture has guaranteed bandwidth and is non-blocking.

Crosspoints can also be switched in the vertical interval to avoid losing picture information, for this the router would need to be genlocked to either black and burst or tri-level sync.

== Control ==
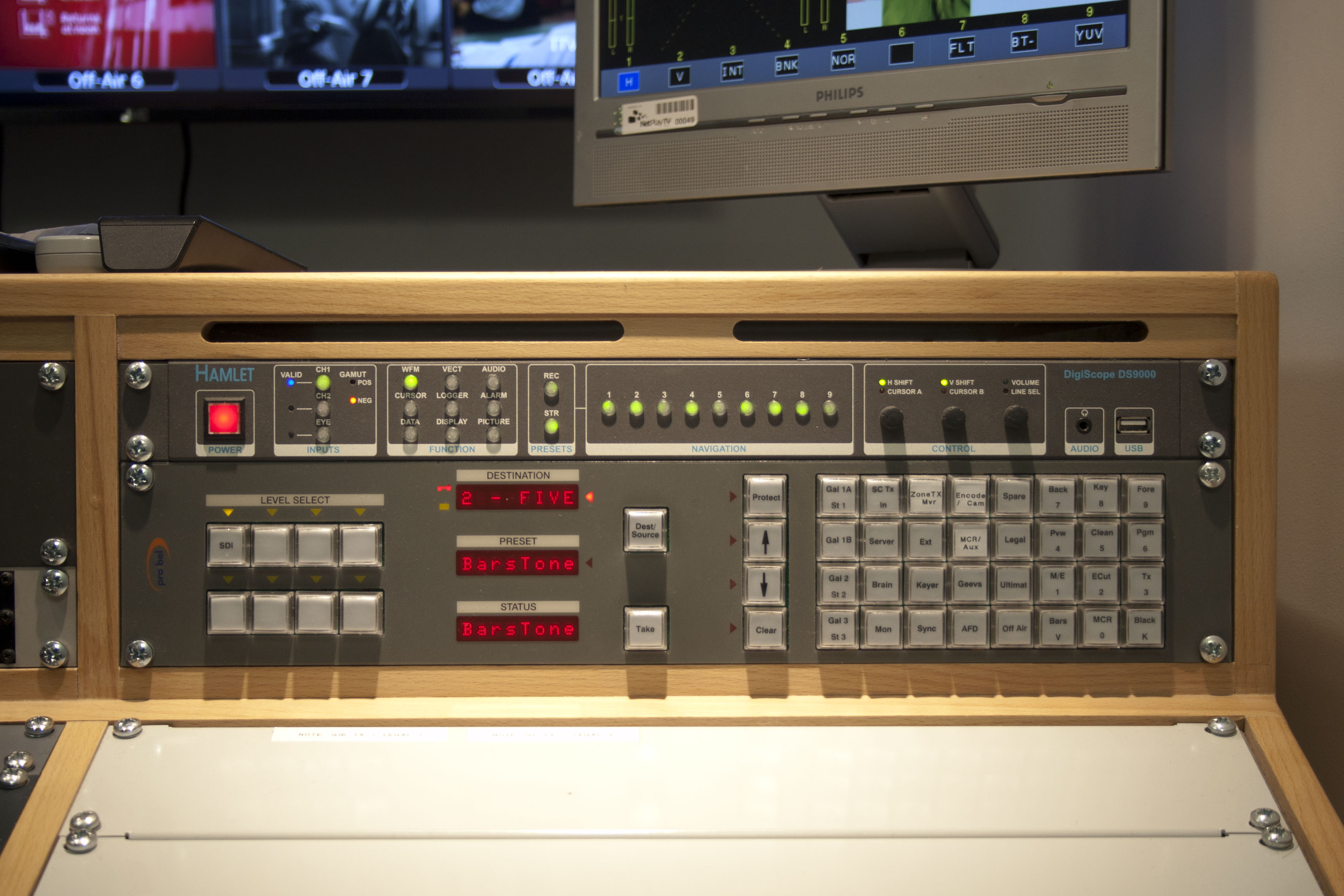
A remote panel for routing video feeds on a Pro-bel video matrix.

Many types of broadcast automation systems can be used to control a video router via IP or serial communications such as RS-422. Video routers can also be controlled by other types of user interfaces, including front panel buttons, IR remote control, or application software running on a PC.

== Future prospects ==
With the advent of 4K/UHD TV, the traditional 'baseband' video router has become something of a victim to the data rates. UHD TV requires 3840x2160P @ 50 Hz or 60 Hz. Traditional crosspoint based devices have therefore been reduced in size by a factor of 4 as the UHD signal is split into 4x1080P@50 Hz/60 Hz 3 Gb/s streams. A few smaller manufacturers (Blackmagic Design, Utah Scientific, Ross Video, PESA) have taken on 12 Gb/s routing over copper coax cable and fiber. Although their router sizes cannot compete with the ~576x1152 size of HD routers, and the distance achievable on copper is somewhat limited. This may mean that baseband architectures start to migrate over to IP based infrastructures. Where UHD TV can be transmitted (albeit compressed) over a single 10 Gb/s link using IT hardware.

== Manufacturers ==
- Ampex
- Blackmagic Design
- Evertz Microsystems
- Imagine Communications
- Pulse-Eight
- Sony
- Thomson Grass Valley

== See also ==
- Audio router
- Vision mixer
