= Vision mixer =

Device for selecting and compositing of live video sources

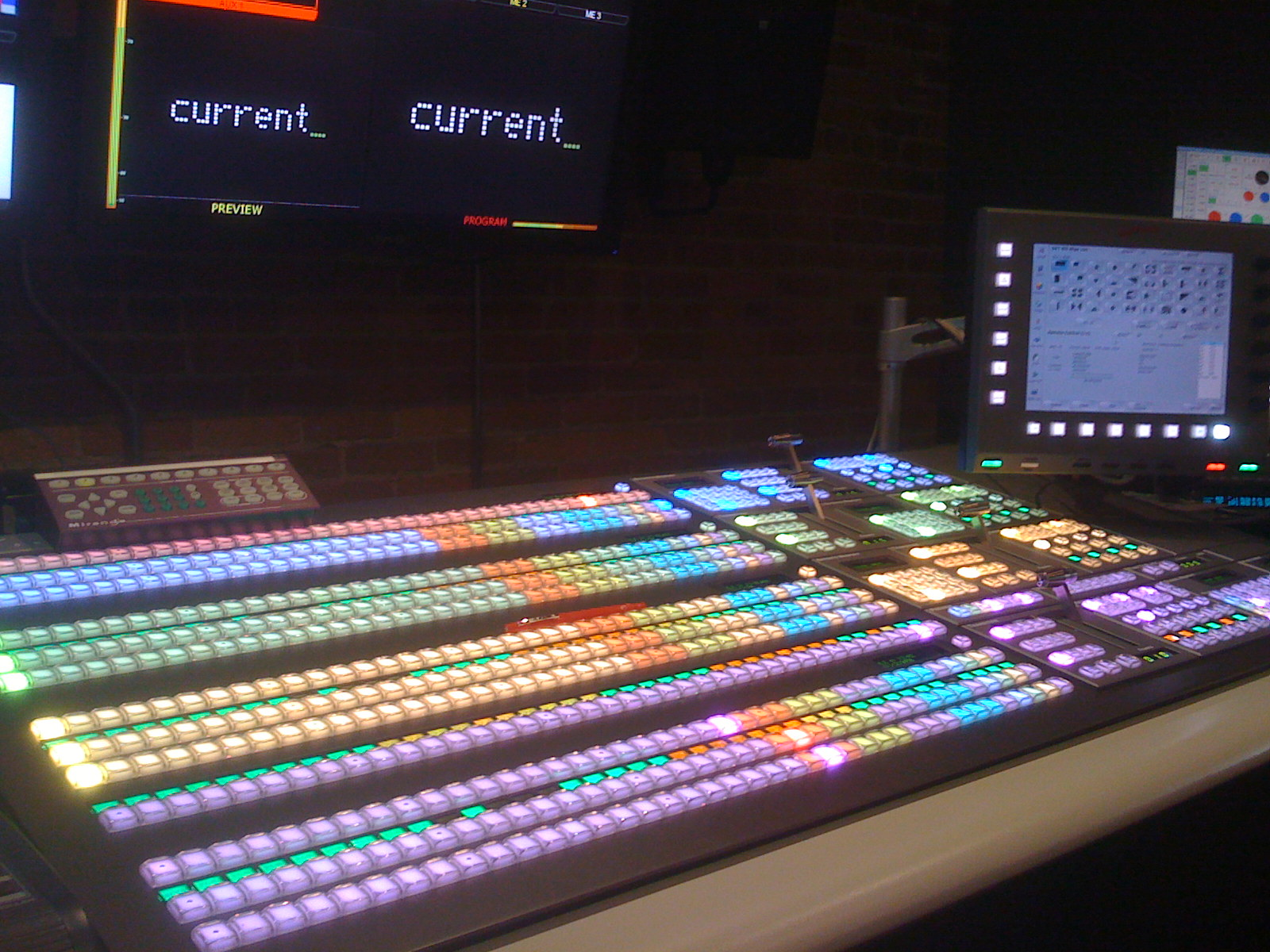
Ross Video Vision 4 at Current TV

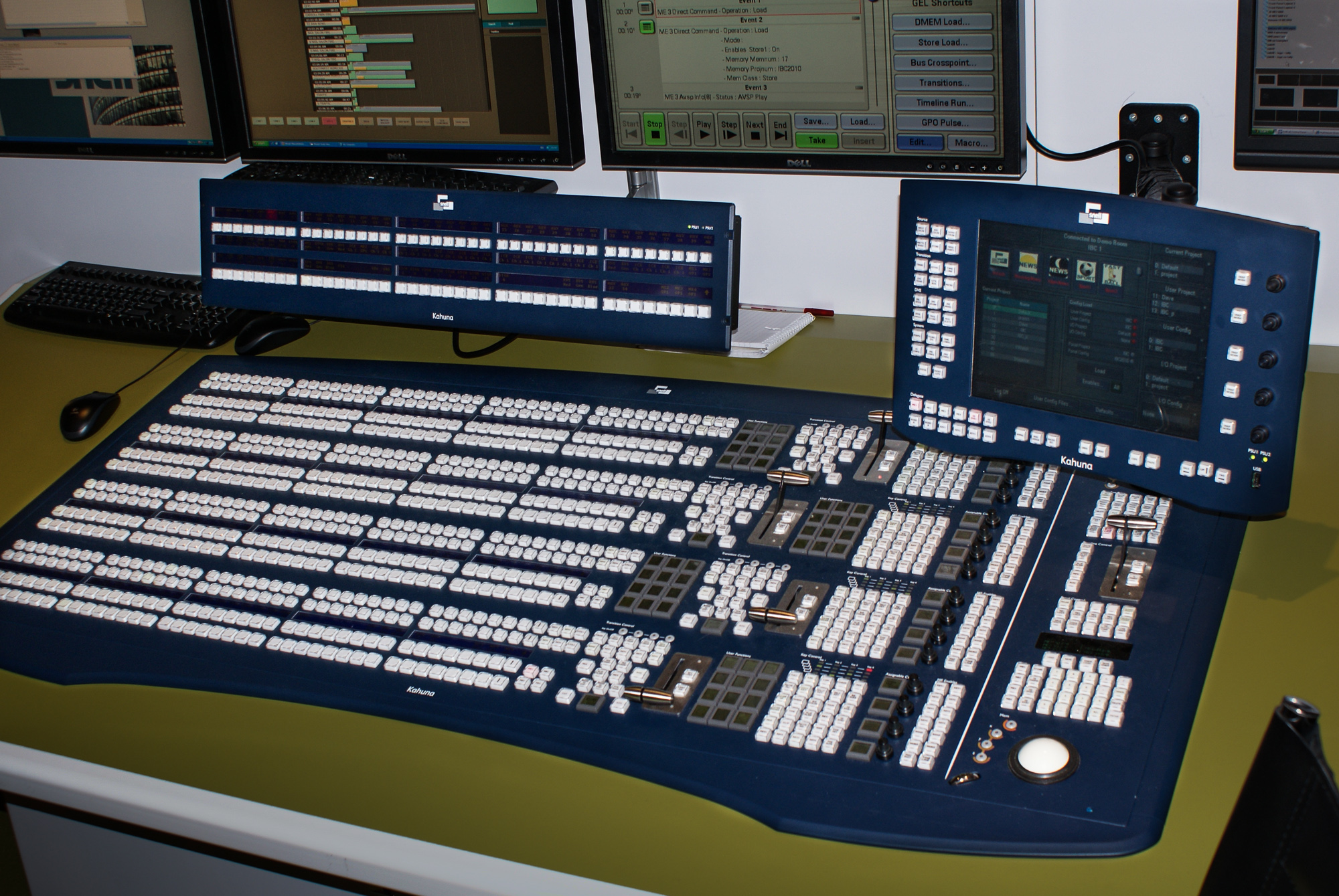
Kahuna video switcher made by Snell Limited company presented at IBC 2010

A vision mixer is a device used to select between different live video sources and, in some cases, compositing live video sources together to create visual effects.

In most of the world, both the equipment and its operator are called a vision mixer or video mixer; however, in the United States, the equipment is called a video switcher, production switcher or video production switcher, and its operator is known as a technical director.

The role of the vision mixer for video is similar to what a mixing console does for audio. Typically a vision mixer would be found in a video production environment such as a production control room of a television studio, production truck or post-production facility.

== Capabilities and usage ==
Besides hard cuts (switching directly between two input signals), mixers can also generate a variety of other transitions, from simple dissolves to pattern wipes. Additionally, most vision mixers can perform keying operations (called mattes in this context) and generate color signals. Vision mixers may include digital video effects (DVE) and still store functionality. Most vision mixers are targeted at the professional market, with analog models having component video connections and digital ones using serial digital interface (SDI) or SMPTE 2110. They are used in live television, such as outside broadcasting, with video tape recording (VTR) and video servers for linear video editing, even though the use of vision mixers in video editing has been largely supplanted by computer-based non-linear editing systems.

While professional analog mixers work with component video inputs. Consumer video switchers may use composite video or S-Video. These are often used for VJing, presentations, and small multi-camera productions.

== Operation ==
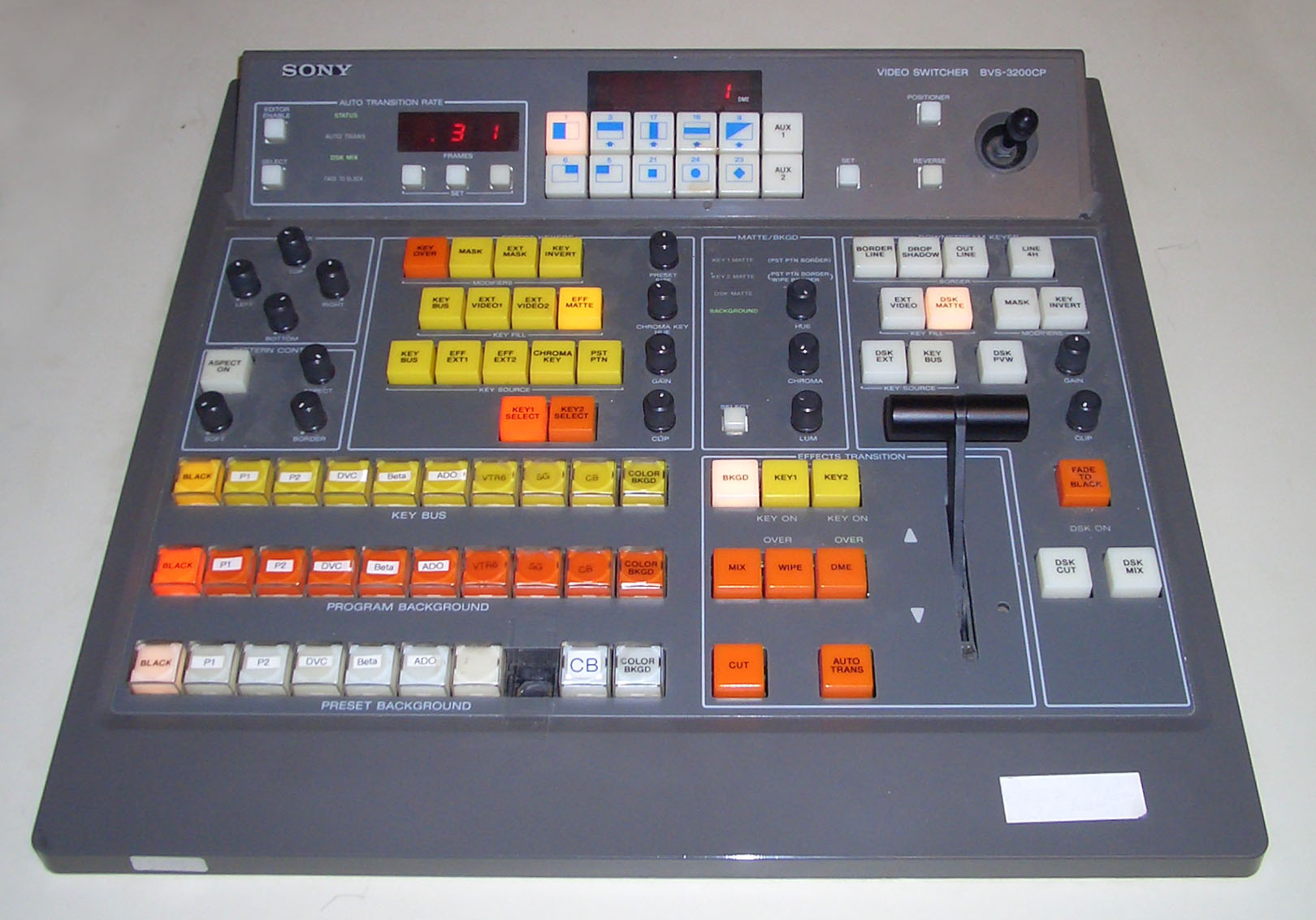
A Sony BVS-3200CP vision mixer

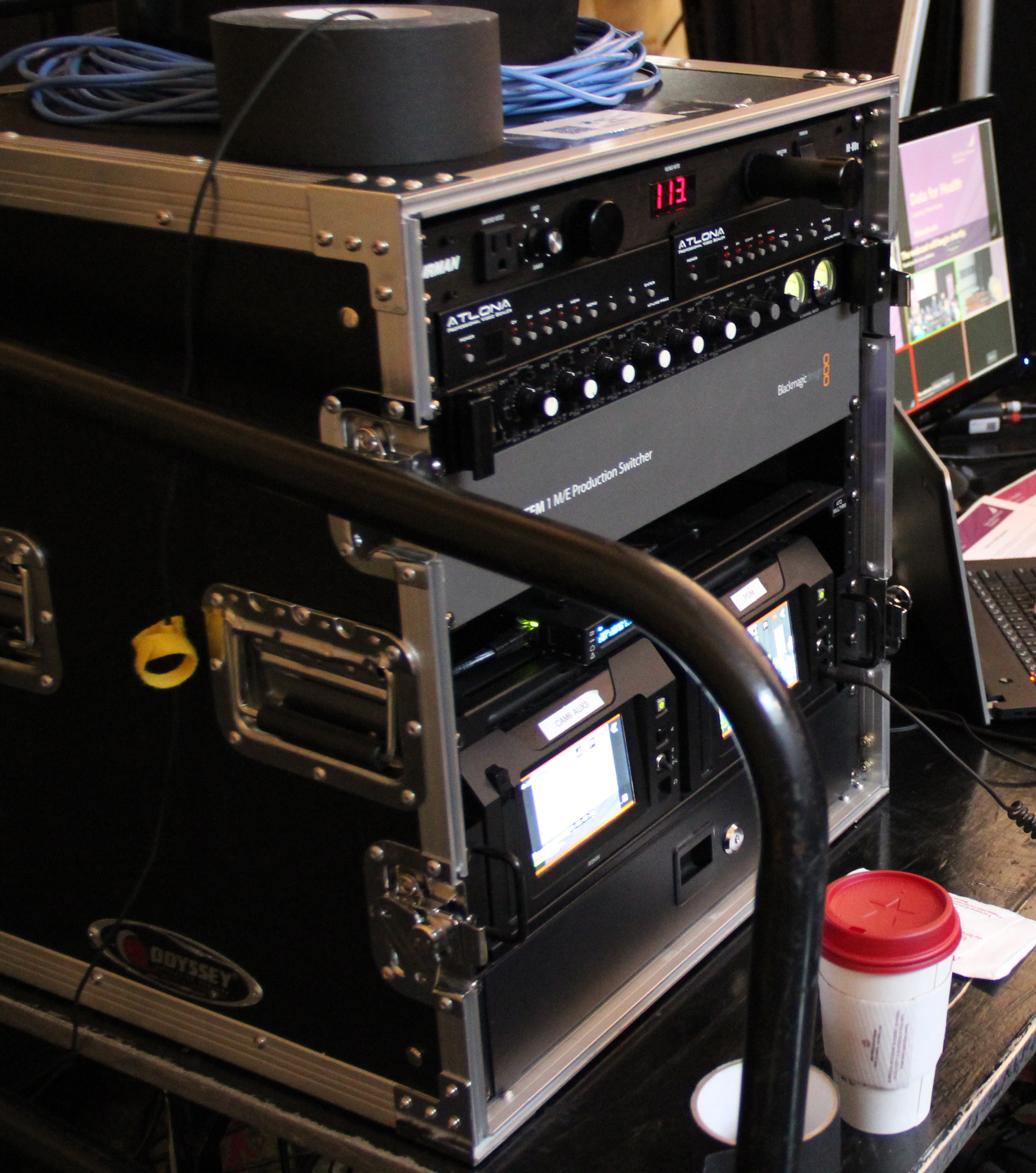
A Blackmagic Design ATEM 1 M/E broadcast switcher (fourth from top of rack), rack-mounted with other equipment in a typical live production environment. Many switchers are separated into two devices: one that does the bulk of video processing (pictured here), and a control surface used by the technical director.

The most basic part of a vision mixer is a bus, which is a signal path consisting of multiple video inputs that feed a single output. On the panel, a bus is represented by a row of buttons; pressing one of those buttons selects the video signal in that bus. Older video mixers had two equivalent buses (called the A and B bus; such a mixer is known as an A/B mixer), and one of these buses could be selected as the main out (or program) bus. Most modern mixers, however, have one bus that is always the program bus, the second main bus being the preview (sometimes called preset) bus. These mixers are called flip-flop mixers, since the selected source of the preview and program buses can be exchanged. Some switchers allow the operator to select A/B or flip-flop modes. Both the preview and program buses usually have their own video monitors displaying the video selected.

Another main feature of a vision mixer is the transition lever, also called a T-bar or fader bar. This lever, similar to an audio fader, is used to transition between two buses. Note that in a flip-flop mixer, the position of the main transition lever does not indicate which bus is active, since the program bus is always the active or hot bus. Instead of moving the lever by hand, a button (commonly labeled mix, auto or auto trans) can be used, which performs the transition over a user-defined period of time. Another button, usually labeled cut or take, swaps the preview signal to the program signal instantaneously. The type of transition used can be selected in the transition section. Common transitions include dissolves (similar to an audio crossfade) and pattern wipes.

A third bus used for compositing is the key bus. A mixer may have more than one key bus, but often they share only one set of buttons. Here, one signal can be selected for keying over the program bus. The digital on-screen graphic image that will be seen in the program is called the fill, while the mask used to cut the key's translucence is called the source. This source, e.g. chrominance, luminance, pattern or split and can be selected in the keying section of the mixer. Usually, a key is turned on and off the same way a transition is. For this, the transition section can be switched from program mode to key mode.

These three main buses together form the basic mixer section called program/preset (P/P). Bigger production mixers may have a number of additional sections of this type, which are called mix/effects (M/E) sections and numbered. Any M/E section can be selected as a source in the P/P stage, making the mixer operations much more versatile, since effects or keys can be composed offline in an M/E and then go live at the push of one button.

After the P/P section, there is another keying stage called the downstream keyer (DSK). It is mostly used for keying text or graphics and has its own cut and mix buttons. The signal before the DSK keyer is called the clean feed. After the DSK is one last stage that overrides any signal with black, usually called fade to black or FTB.

== Setup ==
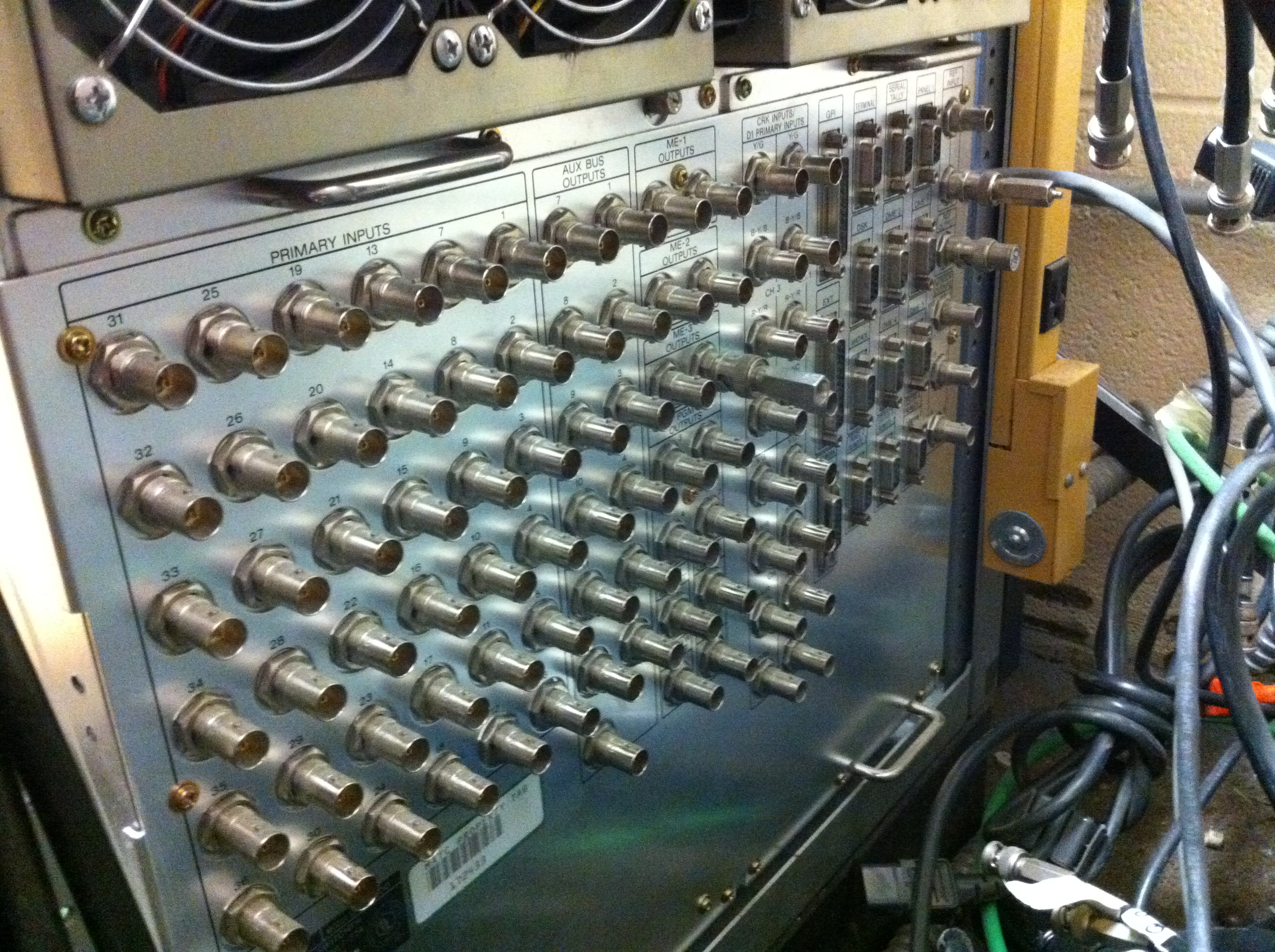
Rear connection panel of a Sony DVS-7000 vision mixer main unit. Some of the BNC connectors accept source inputs, while others output video from the various buses and aux channels. The D-subminiature ports interface with other equipment such as the keyer, tally, and control panel.

Since vision mixers combine various video signals such as VTRs and professional video cameras, all these sources must be in proper synchronization with one another. In professional analog facilities, all the equipment is genlocked with black and burst or tri-level sync from a video-signal generator. The signals that cannot be synchronized (either because they originate outside the facility or because the particular equipment doesn't accept external sync) must go through a frame synchronizer. Some vision mixers have internal frame synchronizers or they can be a separate piece of equipment, such as a time base corrector. If the mixer is used for video editing, the editing console (which usually controls the vision mixer remotely) must also be synchronized.

Most larger vision mixers divide the control panel from the actual hardware that performs the mixer functions because of noise, cooling and cable length considerations. With such mixers, the control panel is located in the production control room, while the main unit, to which all cables are connected, is often located in a machine room alongside the other hardware.

== Manufacturers ==
- Analog Way (manufacturer)
- Barco (manufacturer)
- Blackmagic Design: ATEM
- Broadcast Pix
- Datavideo
- EVS Broadcast Equipment: Dyvi
- FOR-A
- Grass Valley
- Guramex
- Kramer Electronics Ltd.
- NewTek (Video Toaster and TriCaster, bought by Vizrt)
- Panasonic
- Philips (Broadcast Television Systems Inc., broadcast division bought by Thomson SA and later integrated into Grass Valley)
- Roland Corporation
- Ross Video
- Snell (former, bought by Grass Valley)
- Sony

== See also ==
- Audio router
- Patch panel
- Video router
