= Satellite truck =

Mobile communications satellite earth station

A satellite truck or SNG truck is a mobile communications satellite ground station mounted on a truck chassis as a platform. Employed in remote television broadcasts, satellite trucks transmit video signals back to studios or production facilities for editing and broadcasting. Satellite trucks usually travel with a production truck, which contains video cameras, sound equipment and a crew. A satellite truck has a large satellite dish antenna which is pointed at a communication satellite, which then relays the signal back down to the studio. Satellite communication allows transmission from any location that the production truck can reach, provided a line of sight to the desired satellite is available.

Satellite trucks are increasingly being used for data (ISP) services. These remote ISP services are used for disaster recovery and internet connectivity in areas underserved by mobile providers.

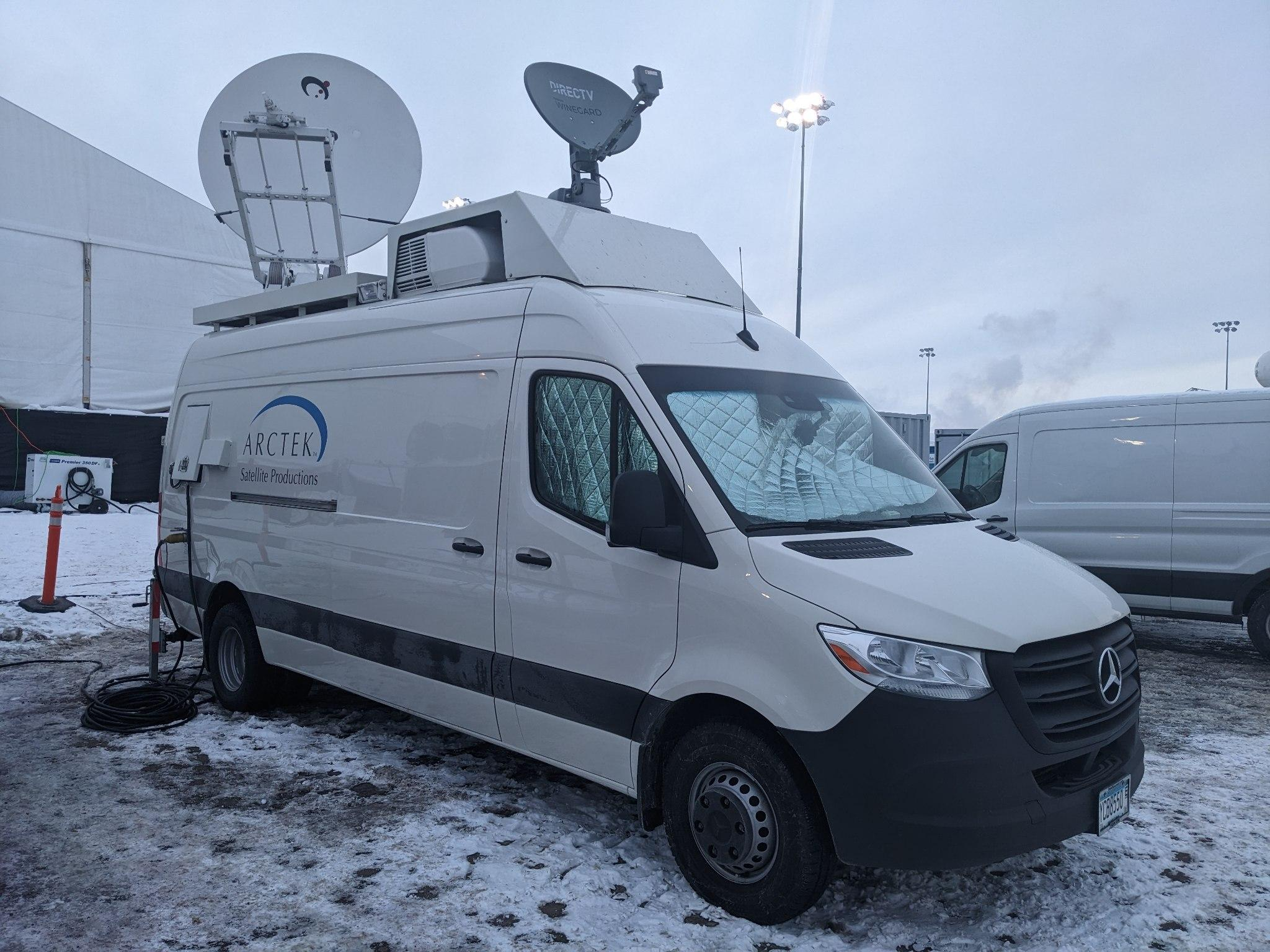
ARCTEK satellite truck 2021 Sprinter

== Equipment ==
Typically, a satellite truck will have its own onboard power source such as an electrical generator or inverter to create the alternating current to power all the transmission systems, which makes it an independent mobile satellite transmission entity. Often, such trucks will also have various degrees of video production equipment and video editing gear. This equipment allows these trucks to also act as mobile electronic news gathering (ENG) facilities, or they can even be outfitted to do electronic field production (EFP), allowing them to create an entire television show with multiple switched professional video cameras, character generators (CG) for digital on-screen graphics, video tape recorders (VTR) and video servers. The truck also have a satellite receiving dish (TVRO, TV receive-only) to monitor the receiving from the satellite of its own transmission or other feeds.

Most satellite trucks have been typically built on a light or mid-duty truck chassis with 6 wheels; usually with 4 tires on the rear axle. All equipment is mounted into the truck in racks that are fabricated into the box. Satellite trucks are generally referred to as 'fixed load' vehicles, meaning that the amount of equipment on-board generally does not change and the weight of the truck (other than fuel) ordinarily does not fluctuate.

== Regulations ==
=== United States ===
Some larger satellite trucks weigh over 26,001 pounds (11,794 kg), and therefore require the driver to obtain a Commercial Driver's License (CDL). Satellite trucks over 10,000 pounds (4,536 kg) GVWR are required to stop at weigh stations, undergo annual DOT inspections, and the Truck driver (usually also operates the truck) needs to pass a physical examination mandated by the DOT, maintain an accurate Drivers Daily Logbook, and comply with Hours of Service rules for professional drivers. Satellite Trucks part of a commercial fleet, or weighing over 10,000 pounds are considered commercial vehicles by the United States Department of Transportation (DOT).

== Uses ==
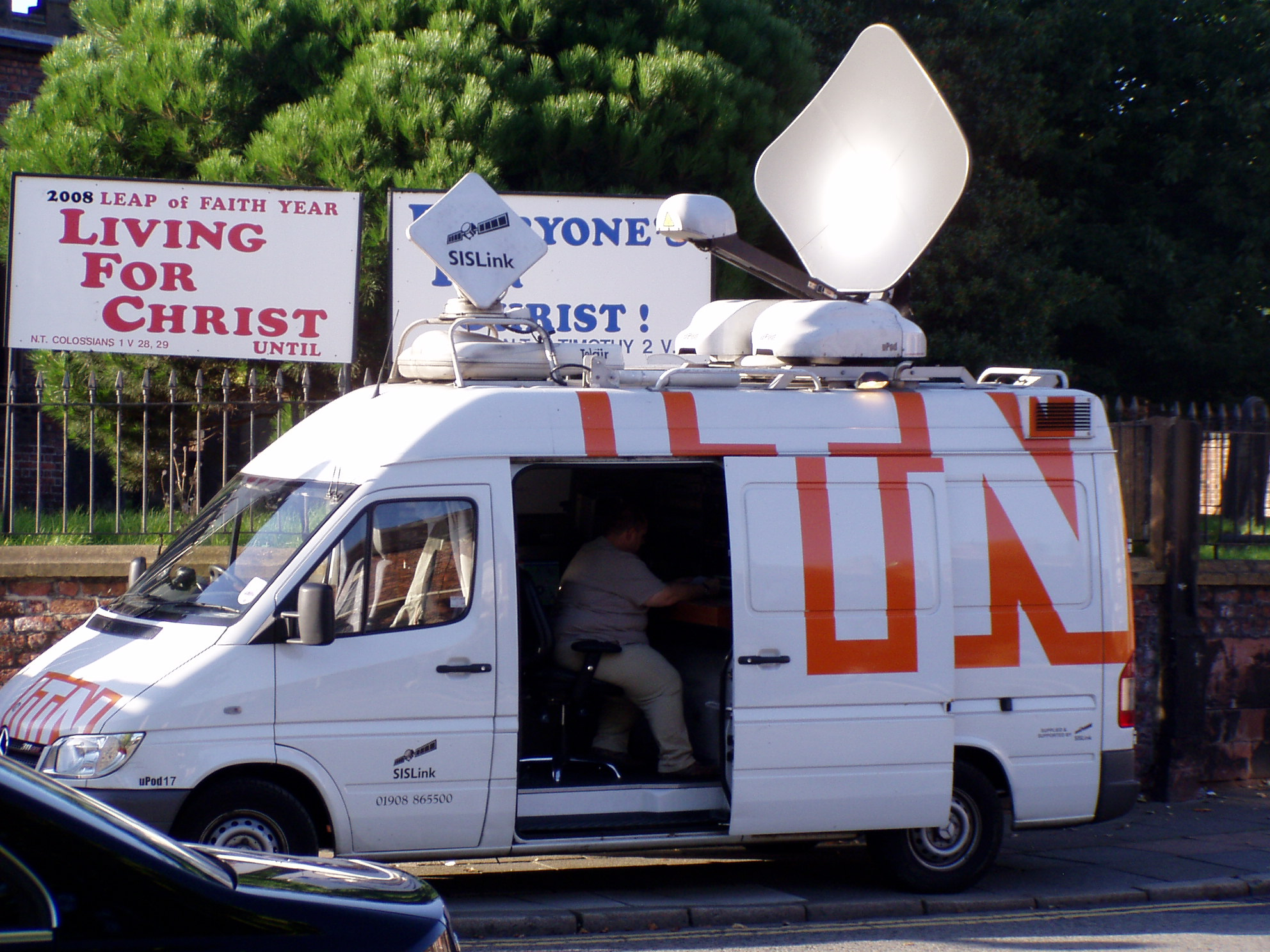
A satellite van of the British news media company ITN in Liverpool

A typical use for a satellite truck is satellite news gathering (SNG), which today in digital form is called DSNG.

Some newer generation satellite trucks are also being used for crisis communications, along with command and control centers for law enforcement, homeland security, emergency managers, and public utility companies.

The fact that these trucks do not rely upon terrestrial (land-based signals received through a conventional aerial) communication systems makes them ideal for information distribution and bandwidth creation in the aftermath of severe tropical cyclones, floods, and earthquakes when these land-based systems are damaged or destroyed. In the wake of Hurricane Katrina, when the communication ability of news media outlets far exceeded that of many federal and state relief agencies, many governmental bodies have since migrated to a mobile satellite-based communication platform.

== C-Band satellite truck ==
C-Band Transportable uplinks ("Transportable Earth Station" (TES)) were initially used to transmit longer-format live television like sports television events and entertainment television programming. C-band satellite transmission requires a larger antenna than the K_{u} band trucks developed later in the 1980s, and a larger satellite antenna takes longer to set up and deploy.

Prior to dispatch of a C Band transportable uplink, an RF Interference study (RFI) needs to be completed. An RFI is a computer-generated report detailing any FCC protected microwave stations in the immediate area. This "frequency coordination" process has to be completed before an uplink transmission can commence. Terrestrial point-to-point signals share C-Band transmit frequencies (5.700-6.500 GHz), and full-time terrestrial signals take priority over ad hoc (temporary) C-Band uplink transmissions. Factors such as terrain, buildings and other structures are considered when determining the likelihood of interference from the TES.

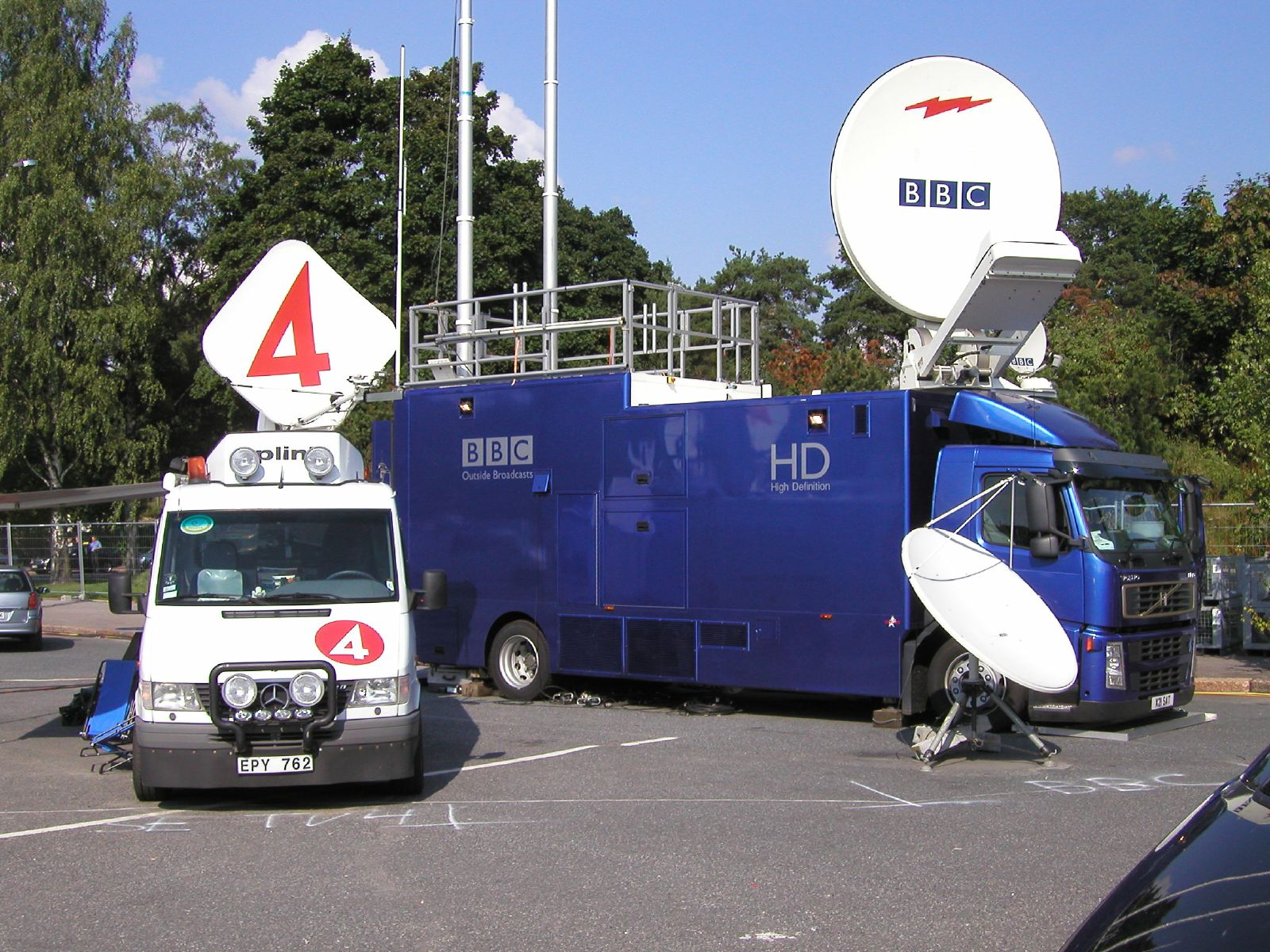
Two satellite trucks in Helsinki, Finland

Historically, it was necessary to install land telephone lines (also called hard or wired lines) where the TES was located. This was expensive and difficult to do at the time, since telephone companies were not used to setting up phone lines without notice of several days or even weeks. Early scrambling or encryption methods required a hard line for authorization of receive sites. Today, a digital cellular telephone is sufficient for most situations.

C-Band transportable service remains a prevalent source of long-haul transmission because of its immunity to the "rain fade" that K_{u} band experiences in significant rainstorms. C-Band transportable services cost more than similar K_{u} service due to the robust nature of the signal, the larger physical size of the truck, and specialized nature of C-Band transmissions.

With the advent of K_{u} band trucks (that do not require frequency coordination) and long-haul fiber-optics providing similar signal qualities, C-Band transportable service experienced a slowdown in service volume in the 1990s. It is still used in situations where rain-fades (a problem affecting only K_{u} band uplinks) are unacceptable and where fiber-optic links are not practical. C-Band uplinks are still commonly used for golf, auto racing, horse racing, and major college sports events in rural areas where local fiber interconnects to long-haul networks are either not available, or where the low number of events at the venue per year makes installation of fiber not cost effective. K_{u} TES' outnumber C-Band TES' around 30:1, when you consider the number of TV stations, network, and "freelance" K_{u} trucks versus the limited number of C-Band trucks.

Even with diminished usage, C-Band transportable services are still utilized as an alternative to fiber-optic cross-country transport as an 'alternate' transmission path. Most broadcast networks utilize both in order to protect their remote broadcasts that may be worth millions in rightsholder fees.

In the 2000s, high-definition television (HDTV) remote broadcasts caused a resurgence in C-Band transportable uplink services. The major factor in its resurgence was the limited amount of available bandwidth in local and long-haul fiber-optic service; uplink systems merely required the installation of High Definition MPEG digital encoders and decoders at either end.

== K_{u} band satellite truck ==
Mobile K_{u} band satellite transmissions for television broadcasts started in Canada, until Conus Communications of St. Paul, MN along with Hubcom in Florida built the first Satellite News Gathering Truck (SNG) in 1983. Along with the truck, and used vans later purchased from Telesat in Canada, Conus developed a communications system which allowed satellite transmissions without the need to drop phone lines. Because of this, it was now possible to go 'live' from anywhere the truck could drive, changing the landscape of Electronic news-gathering.

The development of the mobile phone and its decreasing cost of operation and hardware over the years means trucks do not need a satellite "comms" system in most places. Satellite time was also easily booked on an 'as-needed' basis, typically around $500 per hour for the common K_{u} band TV transmission.

Over the years, K_{u} band Satellite trucks have undergone changes, from large trucks with C-Band dishes outfitted with landing pads and antenna wings to make them FCC compliant, to simpler, rapidly deployable K_{u} band type. K_{u} band uplink vehicles are available in a series of small to large vehicles, varying from an SUV, van, Sprinter, "bread truck (cutaway)", to the more common carryall (2 axle/6 tire truck). Typical K_{u} uplink vehicles are as large as 13 feet by 6 inches tall by 40 feet long, being the largest (non-tractor-trailer type) commercial units allowed on the roads.

Satellite vehicles are either TV station or network-owned. They can be custom suited to their internal usage needs, or are rental units owned by independent companies. Independently owned satellite uplink vehicles are often designed to be versatile, performing multiple uplink functions ranging from straight uplink/downlink services, network news, satellite media tours, or even being configured to becoming a full production vehicle.

Such large uplink trucks now have multiple camera television production capabilities all on board, as pioneered by Satellite Digital Teleproductions (SDTV) in the early 1990s. This combination, being an uplink with production along with a Transportable Earth Station (TES), is now the preferred vehicle for smaller (i.e. one to eight cameras), on location, live television broadcast instead of a separate uplink vehicle working alongside a larger 50-foot tractor trailer production-only vehicle, although the latter is still a regular occurrence.

There are a few combination production/uplink combination vehicles where the uplink system is located on the semi-tractor and the production facilities are in the semi-trailer. These systems add the ability to physically separate the uplink from the production unit. Typical scenarios for this are when the production trailer has to park inside a building, or if the uplink antenna has to be positioned farther away from the production trailer in order to make line-of-sight to the satellite arc.

Larger satellite vehicles are often television production control rooms (PCR), mobile Newsrooms, and/or workspaces on wheels, operated and maintained by broadcast engineers known as satellite truck operators. Operators of these units are known to have a vagabond lifestyle, spending large parts of their lives on the road.

Currently, even a simple flyaway transportable unit can be packed all into two suitcases, all small enough to be airline compliant. Smaller suitcase flyaway units are often used to supplement a build on location television control room, or to provide satellite uplink facilities in locations where a truck cannot be easily transported.

== Satellite truck operation and maintenance ==
Full-time satellite truck operators can earn from USD $35,000 to over $100,000 per year depending on the number of hours worked, years of experience in the field, and the area in the US typically served (positions in major metropolitan areas often compensate more). There are some companies that keep databases of part-time or freelance satellite truck operators.

The National Association of Broadcasters (NAB) occasionally offer courses on the operation of satellite trucks, however most operators have learned their trade from an industry mentor or a combination of both formal in school and on the job informal training.

While helpful, formal training in electronics is not required to be a satellite truck operator. Even camera operators have made the transition from photography to transmission, a clear understanding of the operation of each device on the truck and at what point in the transmission flow it is used are required. Most modern day electronic equipment is too complicated to repair, especially in the field. Truck operators, however, are expected to be able to quickly identify a defective device and either replace it or engineer a way around it. It is for this reason a strong transmission flow understanding is essential.

Having a background in auto mechanics can also help, especially considering that many truck's main power source is a diesel generator. At the absolute least, an operator should know how to change oil, fuel, or an air filter and troubleshoot common engine problems (e.g. burning oil, fuel pump failure, starter/alternator issues).

Like other vehicles, trucks need regular maintenance and upkeep. Older trucks are more difficult to maintain because of increased vehicle wear, availability of parts (for discontinued nameplates), and availability of qualified service personnel fluent in maintenance issues of older vehicles. The expected lifespan for most truck chassis is roughly 8–10 years or 200,000 miles, dependent on its operating environment. It is common for satellite truck boxes to be swapped over to a newer chassis.

Driving the truck to and from event locations is a large, often overlooked, part of the job. Satellite truck operators are often not as interchangeable as reporters, producers, or camera crews, and as a result, can be worked full news cycles (e.g. morning to night). When this happens, the DOT Hours of Service rules may prohibit the operator to drive the truck. This often proves to be complicated for planning and logistic purposes.

By the very nature of the work, a truck operator is expected to travel, often at a moment's notice. Most uplink-for-hire operators keep a packed suitcase with at least 7 days of clothing in or near the truck for prompt deployment.

== See also ==
- Electronic news gathering
- Production truck
- Outside broadcasting
