= Outside broadcasting =

Remote production of television or radio programmes

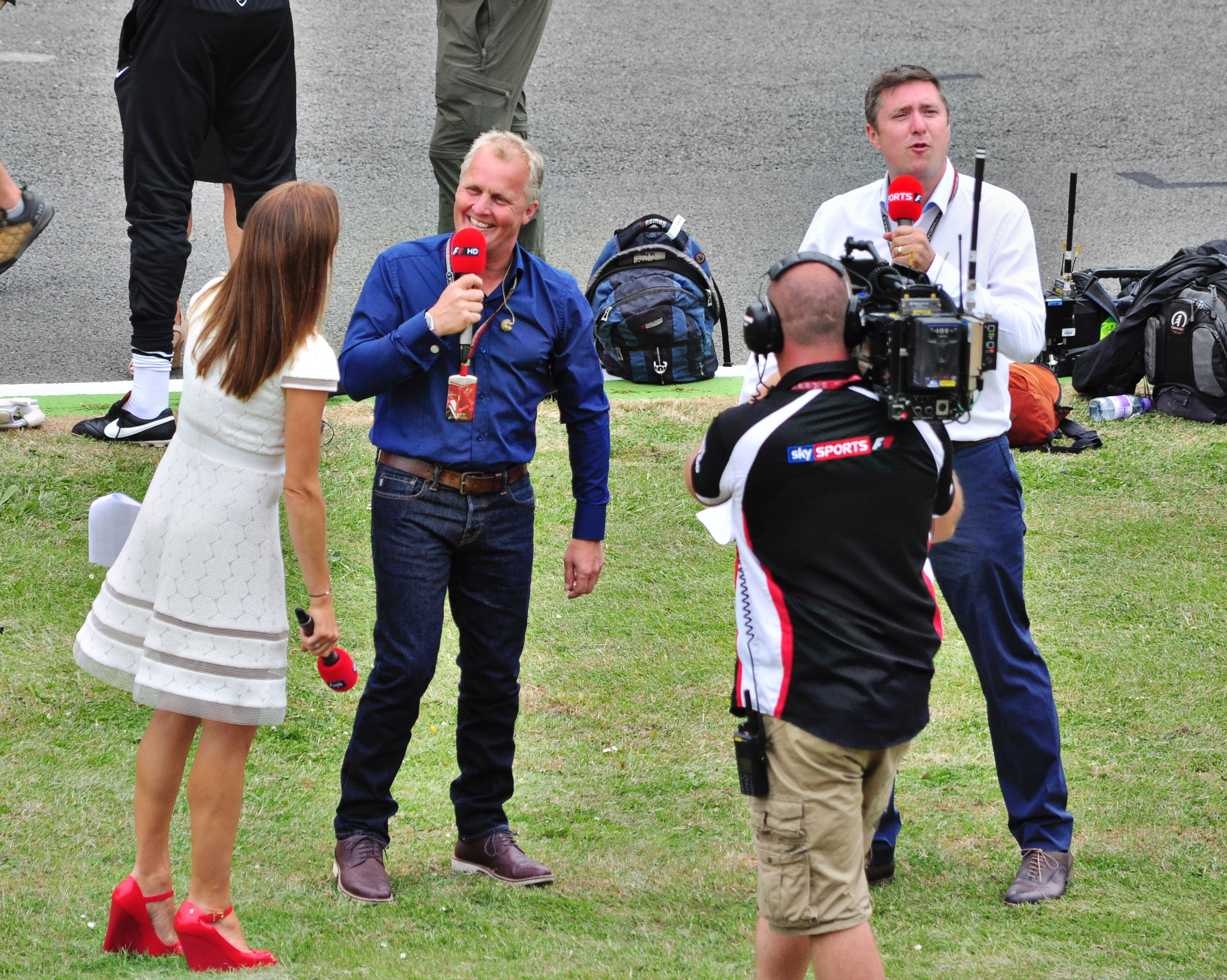
Presenters and camera operator of Sky Sports F1 on an outside broadcast in 2014.

Outside broadcasting (OB) is the electronic field production (EFP) of television or radio programmes (typically to cover television news and sports television events) from a mobile remote broadcast television studio. Professional video camera and microphone signals come into the production truck for processing, recording and possibly transmission.

Some outside broadcasts use a mobile production control room (PCR) inside a production truck.

== History ==
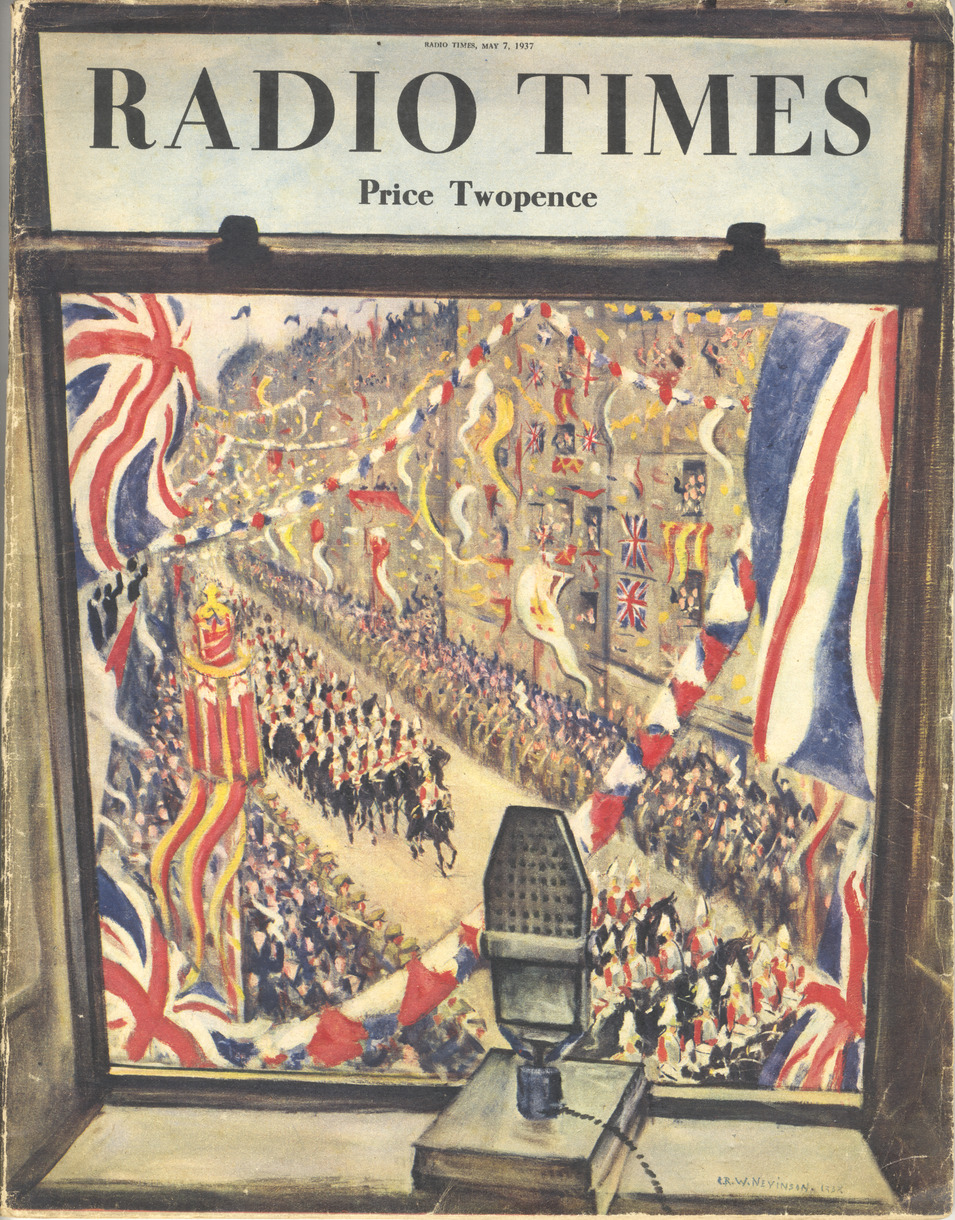
Cover of the 7 May 1937 edition of Radio Times, by C. R. W. Nevinson, marking the televised Coronation of King George VI and Queen Elizabeth - the first coronation to be broadcast, and partially televised, live

Outside radio broadcasts have been taking place since the early 1920s and television ones since the late 1920s. The first outside broadcast by the British Broadcasting Company was of the British National Opera Company production of The Magic Flute from the Royal Opera House, Covent Garden on 8 January, 1923. The BBC's longest-running outside broadcast programme, Choral Evensong, began on 7 October 1926, relaying sung evening prayer live from cathedrals, university college chapels and churches throughout the United Kingdom.

The first large-scale outside broadcast was the televising of the Coronation of George VI and Elizabeth in May 1937, done by the BBC's first Outside Broadcast truck, MCR 1 (short for Mobile Control Room).

After the Second World War, the first notable outside broadcast was of the 1948 Summer Olympics. The Coronation of Elizabeth II followed in 1953, with 21 cameras being used to cover the event.

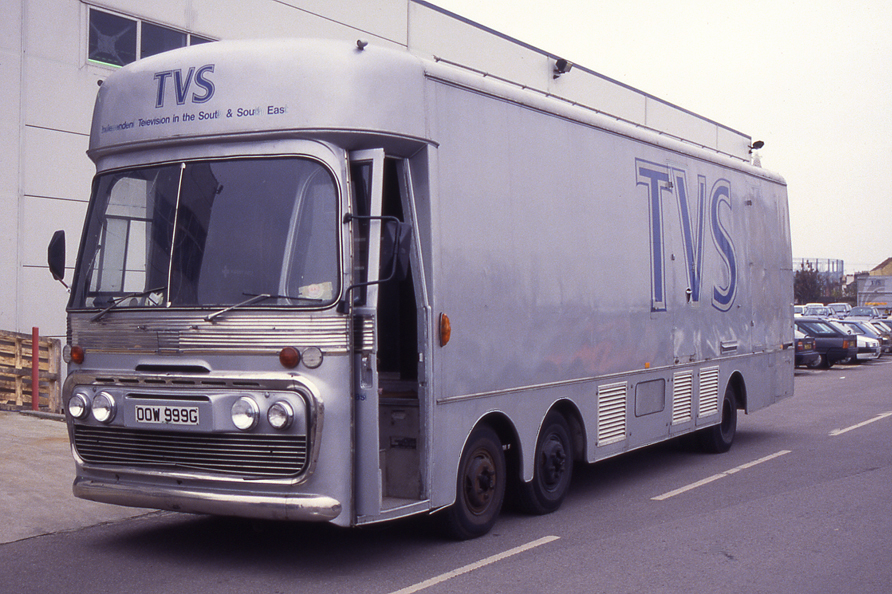
Television South (TVS) OB Unit 1 as seen in 1991

In December 1963 instant replays were used for the first time. Director Tony Verna used the technique on the Army–Navy Game which aired on CBS Sports on December 7, 1963.

The 1968 Summer Olympics was the first with competitions televised in colour. The 1972 Olympic Games were the first where all competitions were captured by outside broadcast cameras.

During the 1970s, ITV franchise holder Southern Television was unique in having an outside broadcast boat, named Southener.

The wedding of Prince Charles and Lady Diana Spencer in July 1981 was the biggest outside broadcast at the time, with an estimated 750 million viewers.

=== New technology ===
In 2008, the first 3D outside broadcast took place with the transmission of a Calcutta Cup rugby match, but only to an audience of industry professionals who had been invited by BBC Sport.

In March 2010, the first public 3D outside broadcast took place with an NHL game between the New York Rangers and New York Islanders.

The first commercial ultra-high definition outside broadcast was a Premier League game between Stoke City v West Ham, televised by Sky Sports in August 2013.

Tests in 8K resolution outside broadcasts began to take place during the 2010s, including tests by NHK and BT Sport. The first public 8K outside broadcast in the UK took place in February 2020.

== Modern applications ==
Modern outside broadcasts now use specially designed OB vehicles, many of which are now built based around IP technology rather than relying on coaxial cable.

There has been an increasing rise in the use of flyaway or flyback Portable Production Units, which allow for an increased level of customisation and can be rigged in a larger variety of venues.

In the past many outside broadcasting applications have relied on using satellite uplinks to broadcast live audio and video back to the studio. While this has its advantages such as the ability to set up anywhere covered by the respective geostationary satellite, satellite uplinking is relatively expensive and the round trip latency is in the range of 240 to 280 milliseconds.

As more venues install fiber optic cable, this is increasingly used. For news gathering, contribution over public internet is also now used. Modern applications such as hardware and software IP codecs have allowed the use of public 3G/4G networks to broadcast video and audio. The latency of 3G is around 100–500 ms, while 4G is less than 100 ms.

== Gallery ==
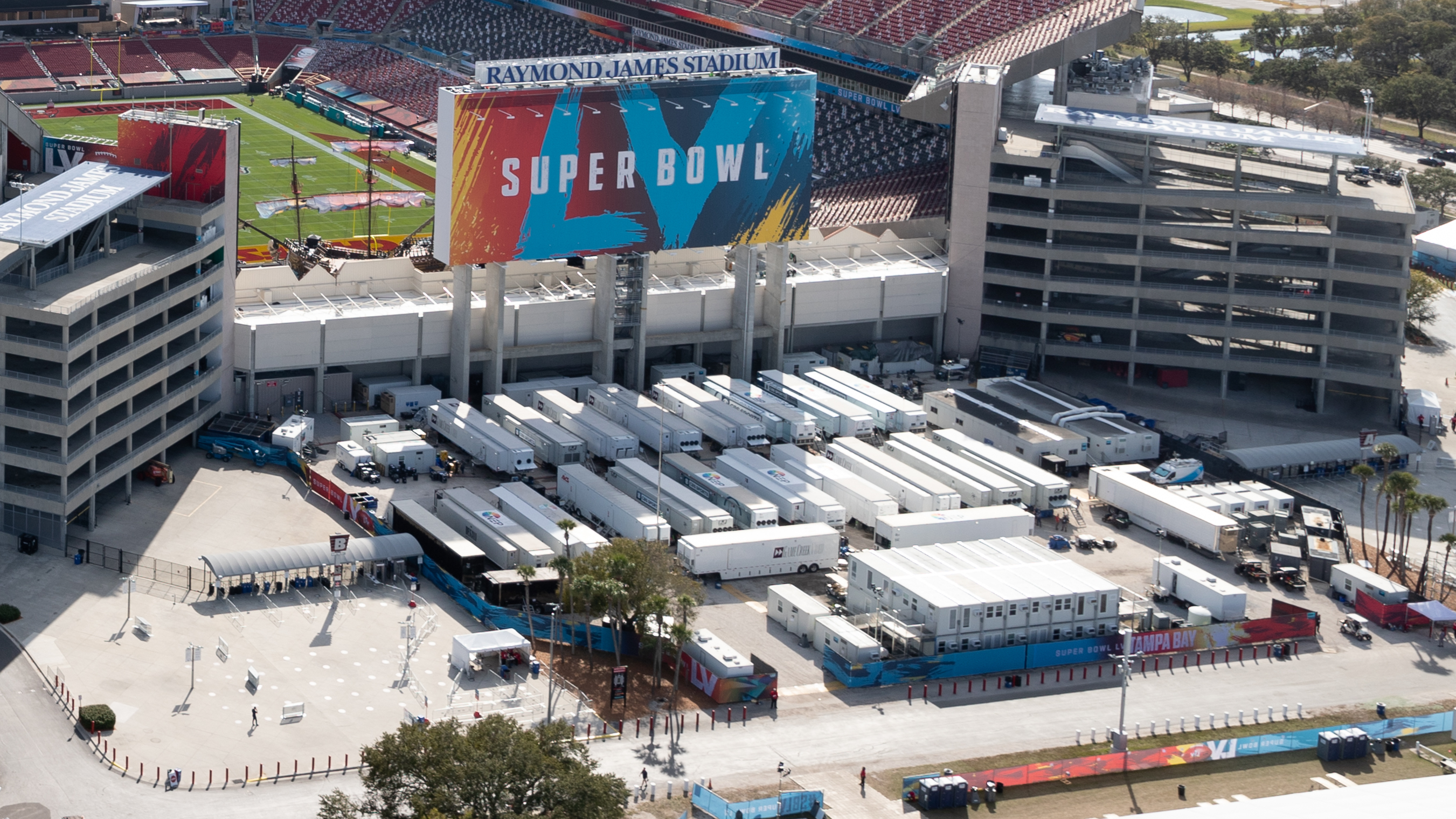
Outside broadcast vehicles at Raymond James Stadium in advance of Super Bowl LV

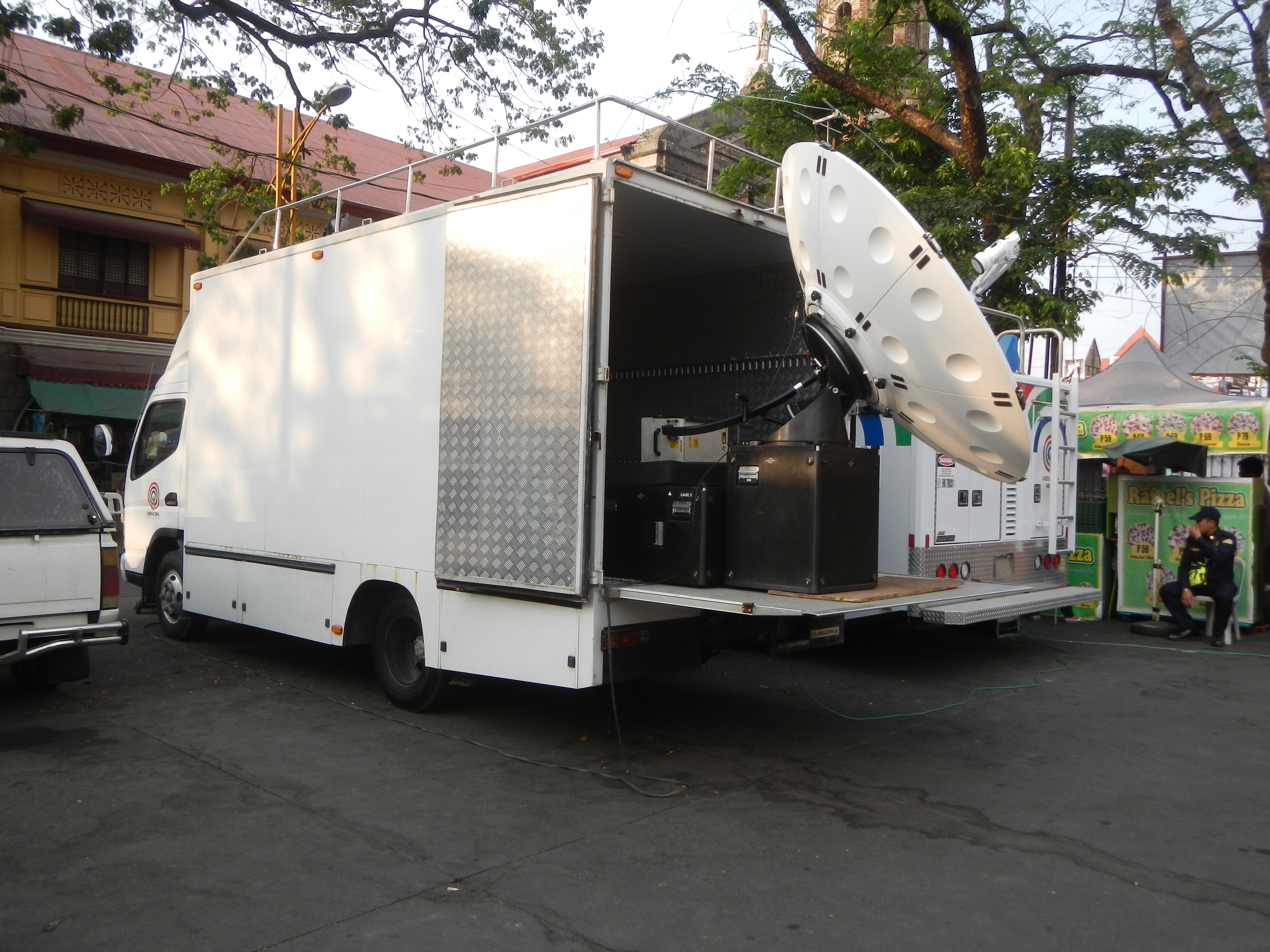
An ABS-CBN OB van transmitting a satellite feed

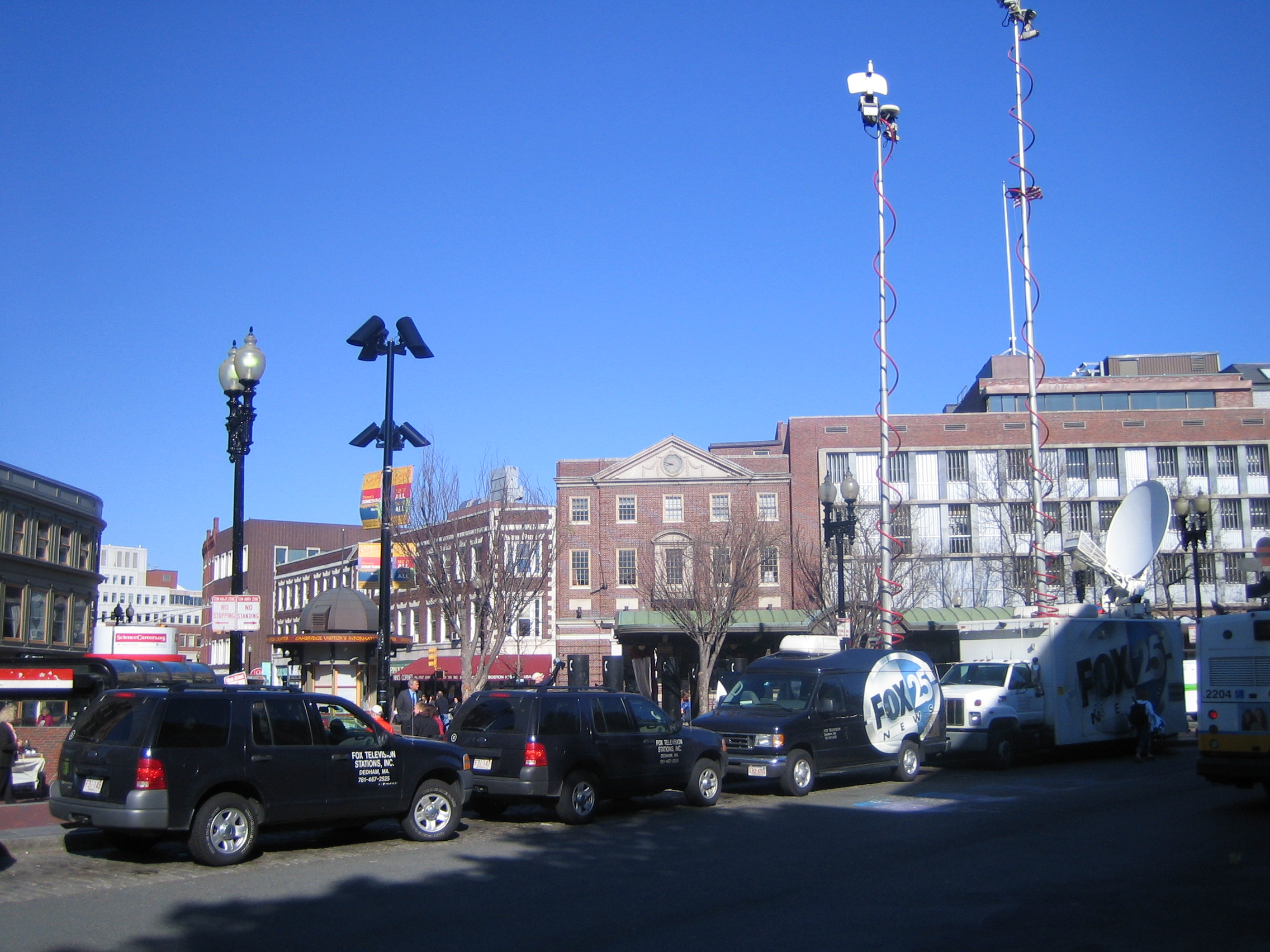
WFXT's trucks in Boston's Harvard Square

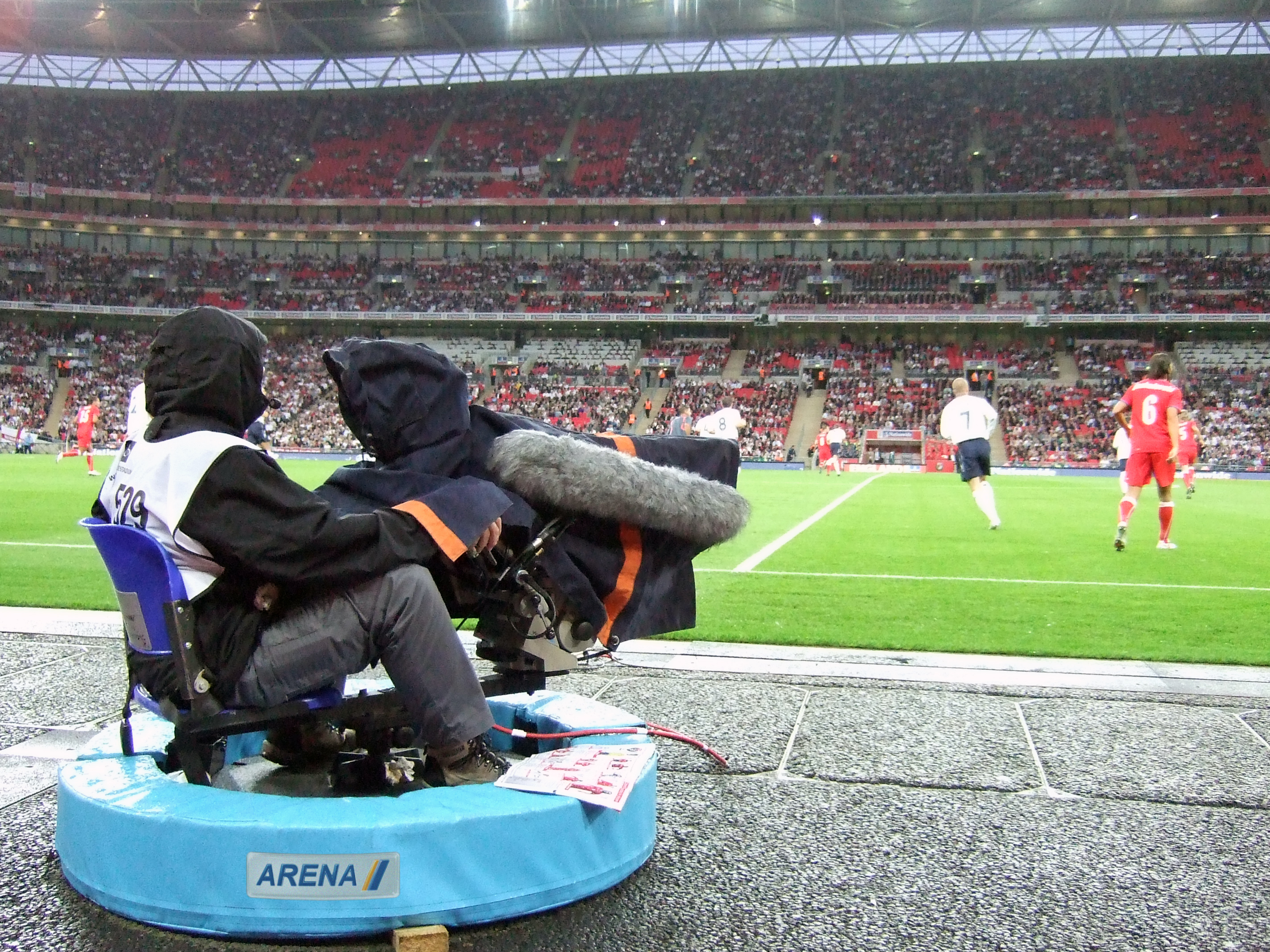
Camera operator working on an outside broadcast of a football match at Wembley Stadium

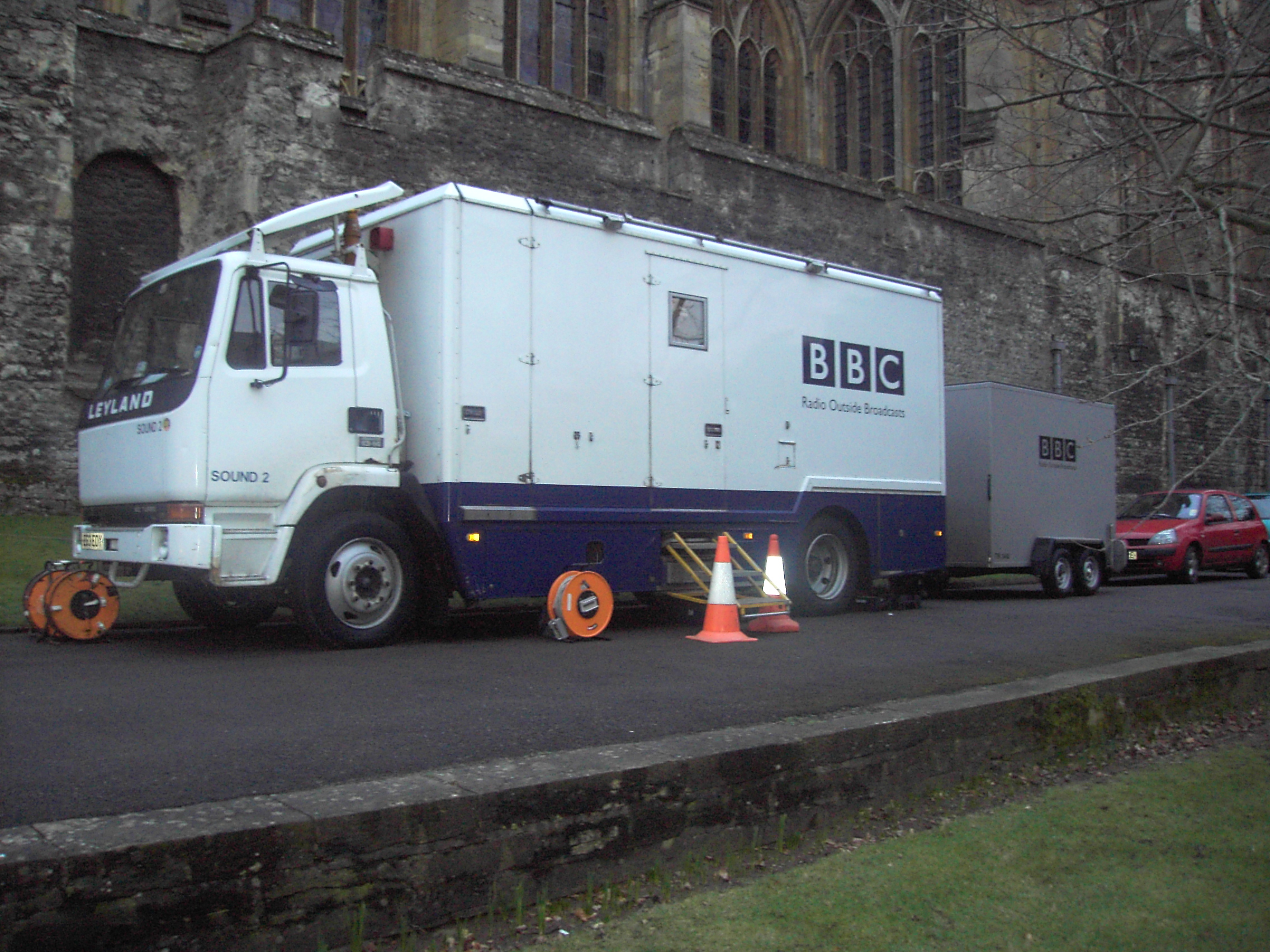
A BBC Radio outside broadcasting van at New College, Oxford

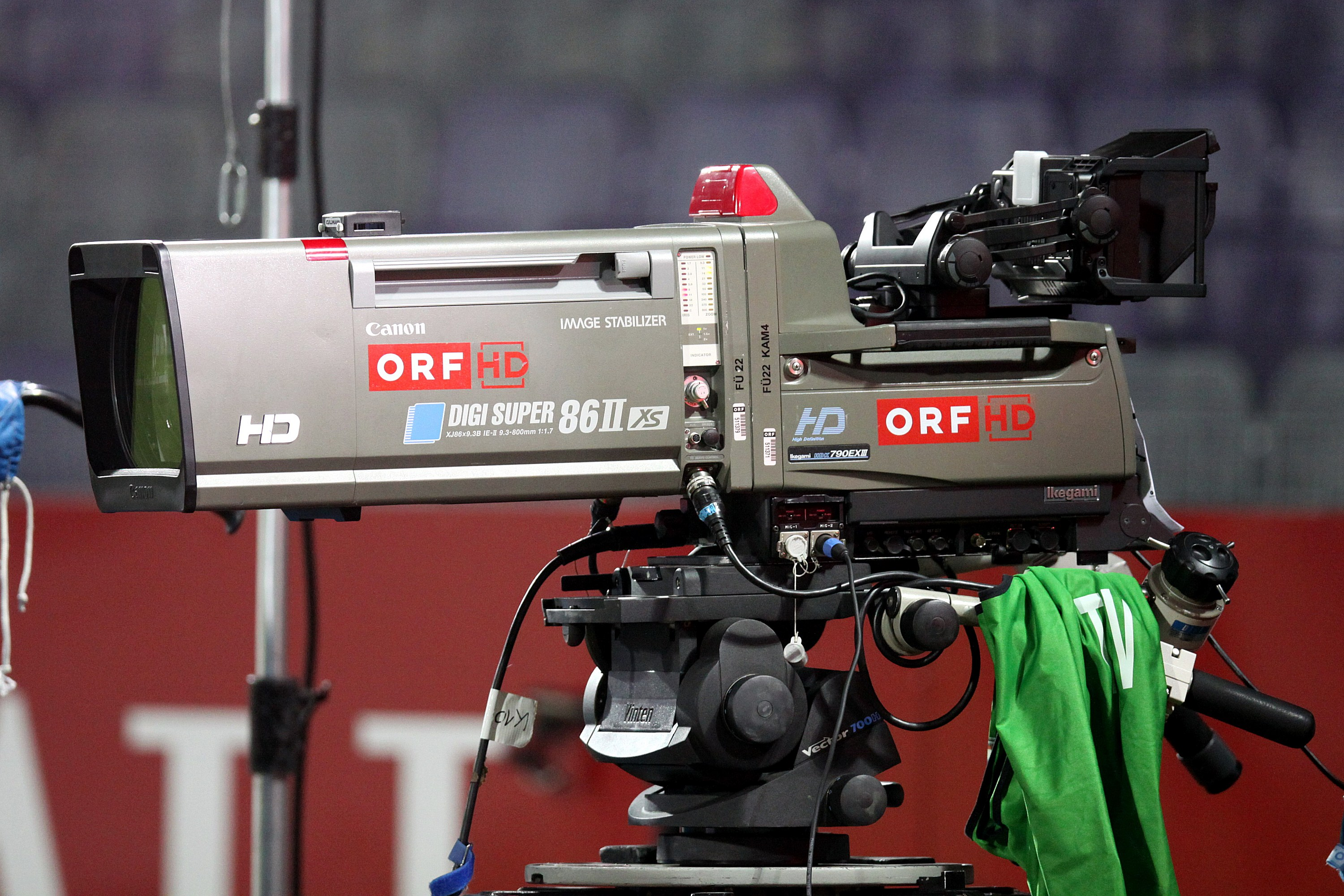
An Ikegami camera with Canon DIGISUPER lens of ORF at a football match

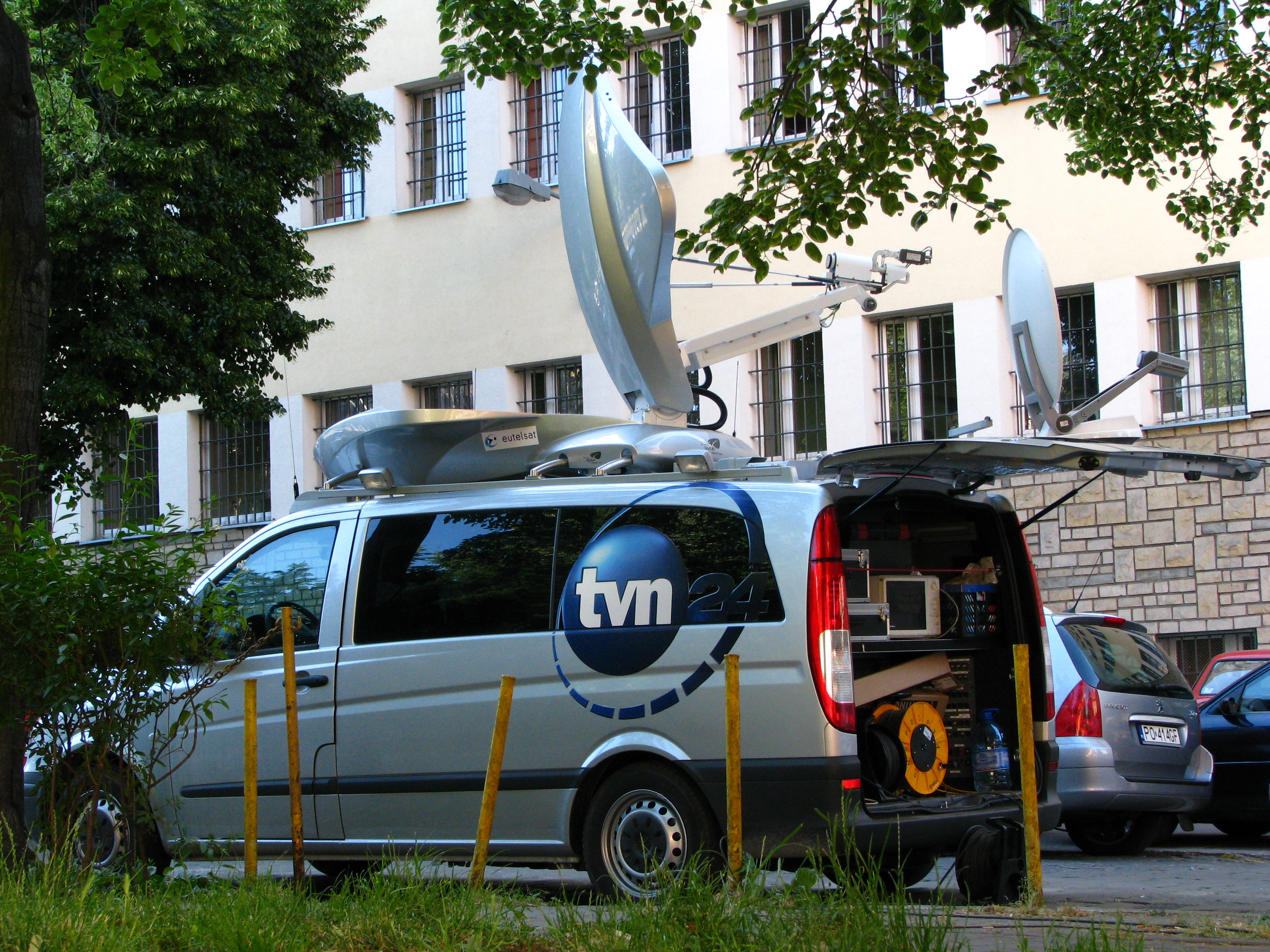
A TVN24 outside broadcasting van in Poznań, Poland

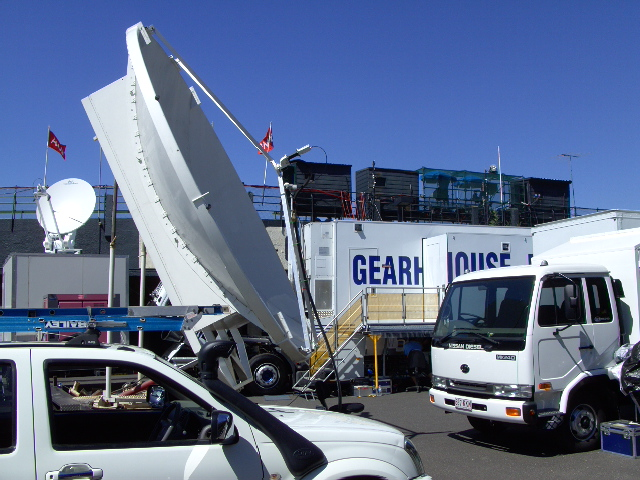
OB for tennis tournament: Extendible-sided production van, satellite dishes, generator truck; see two OB cameras and three announcing booths at top of stadium beyond. Kooyong, Victoria, Australia, 2008

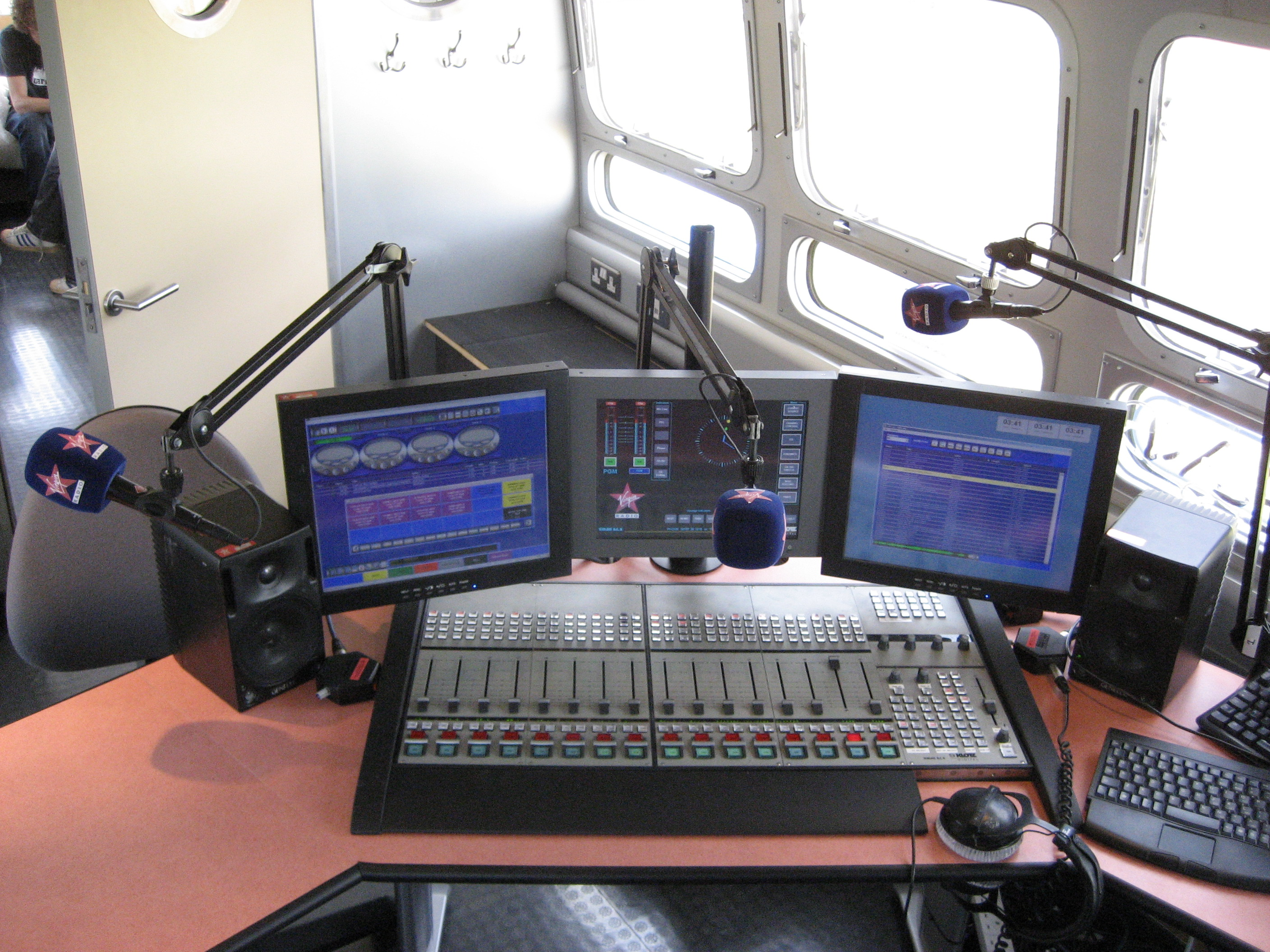
Klotz Digital's Vadis DC II mixer for use at a Virgin Radio outside broadcast at the V Festival 2007

== See also ==
- Production truck
- Satellite truck
- Electronic news-gathering (ENG)
