= Electronic news gathering =

Technique of delivering the news on television

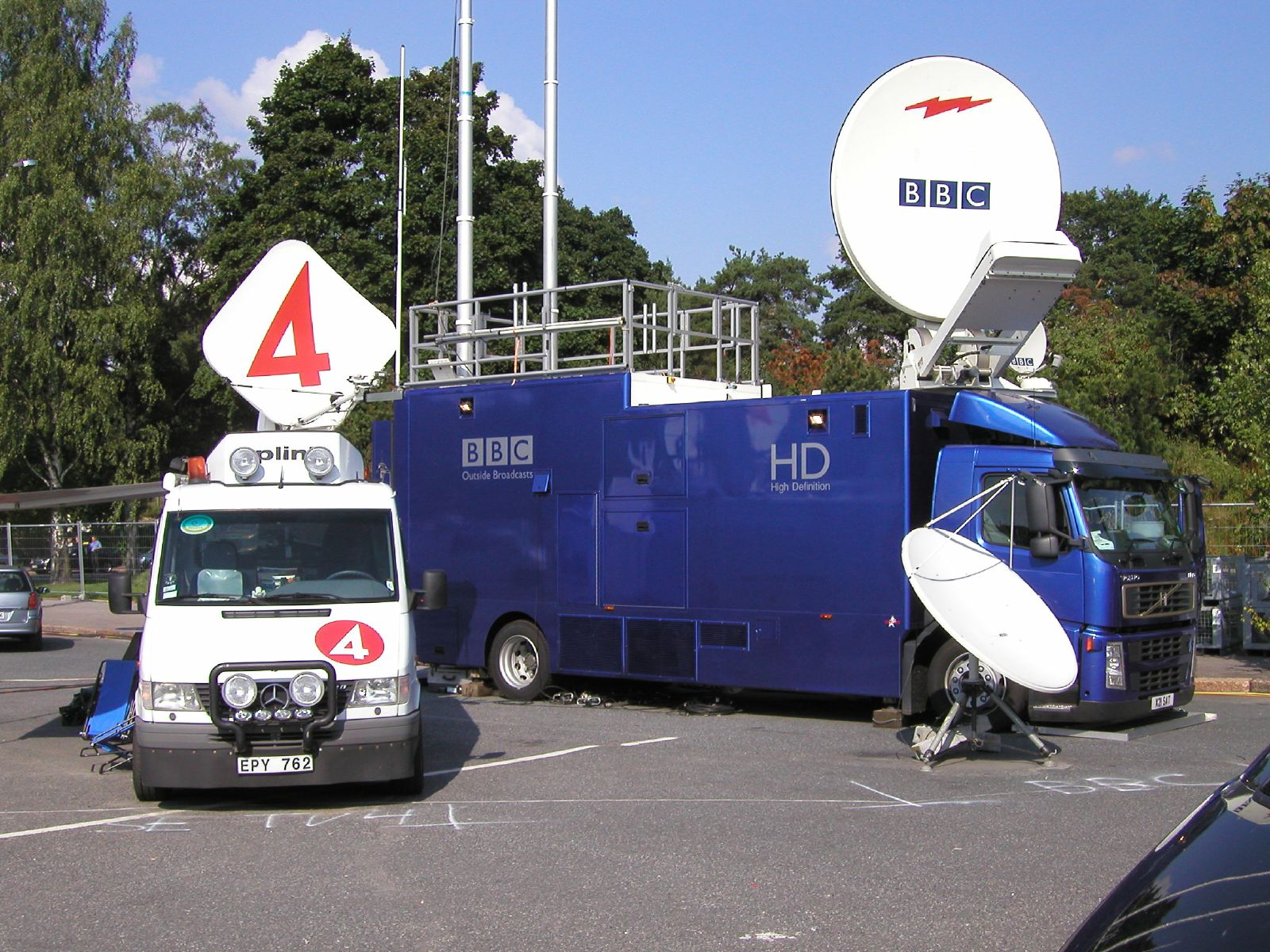
The TV4 and BBC HD satellite uplink DSNG using satellite trucks at the IAAF World Athletics Championships in Helsinki, Finland

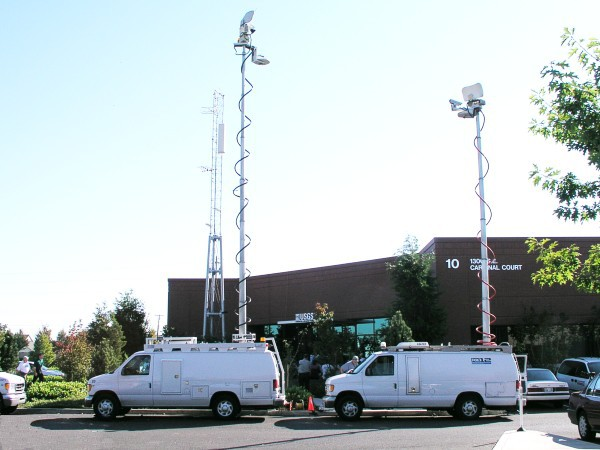
Microwave trucks seen transmitting. Modern news employs these trucks extensively.

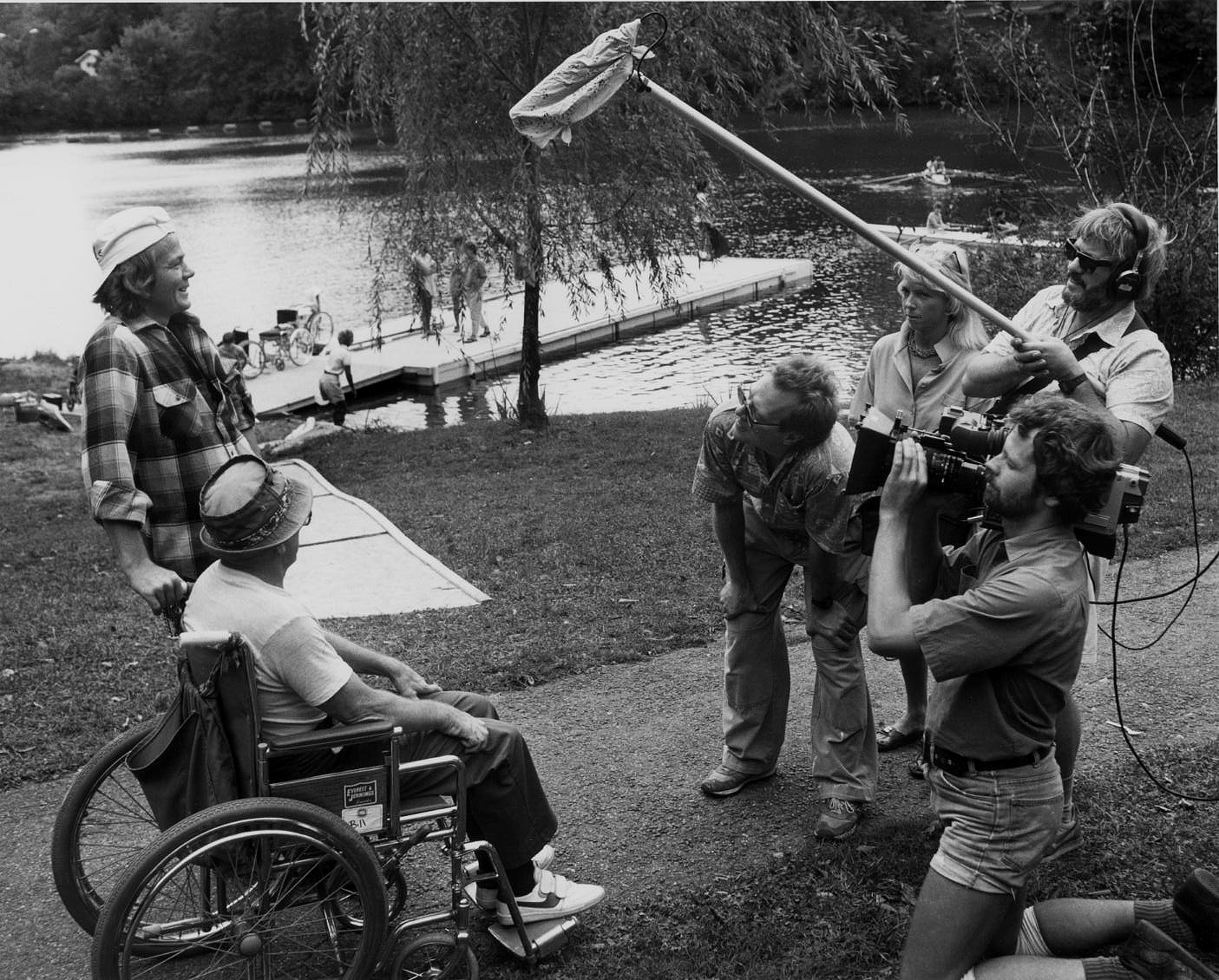
On location outside Baltimore, cameraman Jim Furrer, sound recordist Bill Porter, and director David Ryan interview participants in a public rowing clinic as part of an early electronic journalism shoot in the 1980s.

Electronic news gathering (ENG) or electronic journalism (EJ) is usage of electronic video and audio technologies by reporters to gather and present news instead of using film cameras. The term was coined during the rise of videotape technology in the 1970s. ENG can involve anything from a single reporter with a single professional video camera, to an entire television crew taking a truck on location.

== Beginnings ==
=== Shortcomings of film ===
The term ENG was created as television news departments moved from film-based news gathering to electronic field production technology in the 1970s. Since film requires chemical processing before it can be viewed and edited, it generally took at least an hour from the time the film arrived back at the television station or network news department until it was ready to be broadcast. Film editing was done by hand on what was known as "color reversal" film, usually Kodak Ektachrome, meaning there were no negatives. Color reversal film had replaced black-and-white film as television itself evolved from black-and-white to color broadcasting. Filmo cameras were most commonly used for silent filming, while Auricon cameras were used for filming with synchronized sound. Since editing required cutting the film into segments and then splicing them together, a common problem was film breaking during the newscast. News stories were often transferred to bulky 2-inch videotape for distribution and playback, which made the content cumbersome to access.

Film remained important in daily news operations until the late 1960s, when news outlets adopted portable professional video cameras, portable recorders, wireless microphones and joined those with various microwave- and satellite truck-linked delivery systems. By the mid-1980s, film had all but disappeared from use in television journalism.

=== Transition to ENG ===
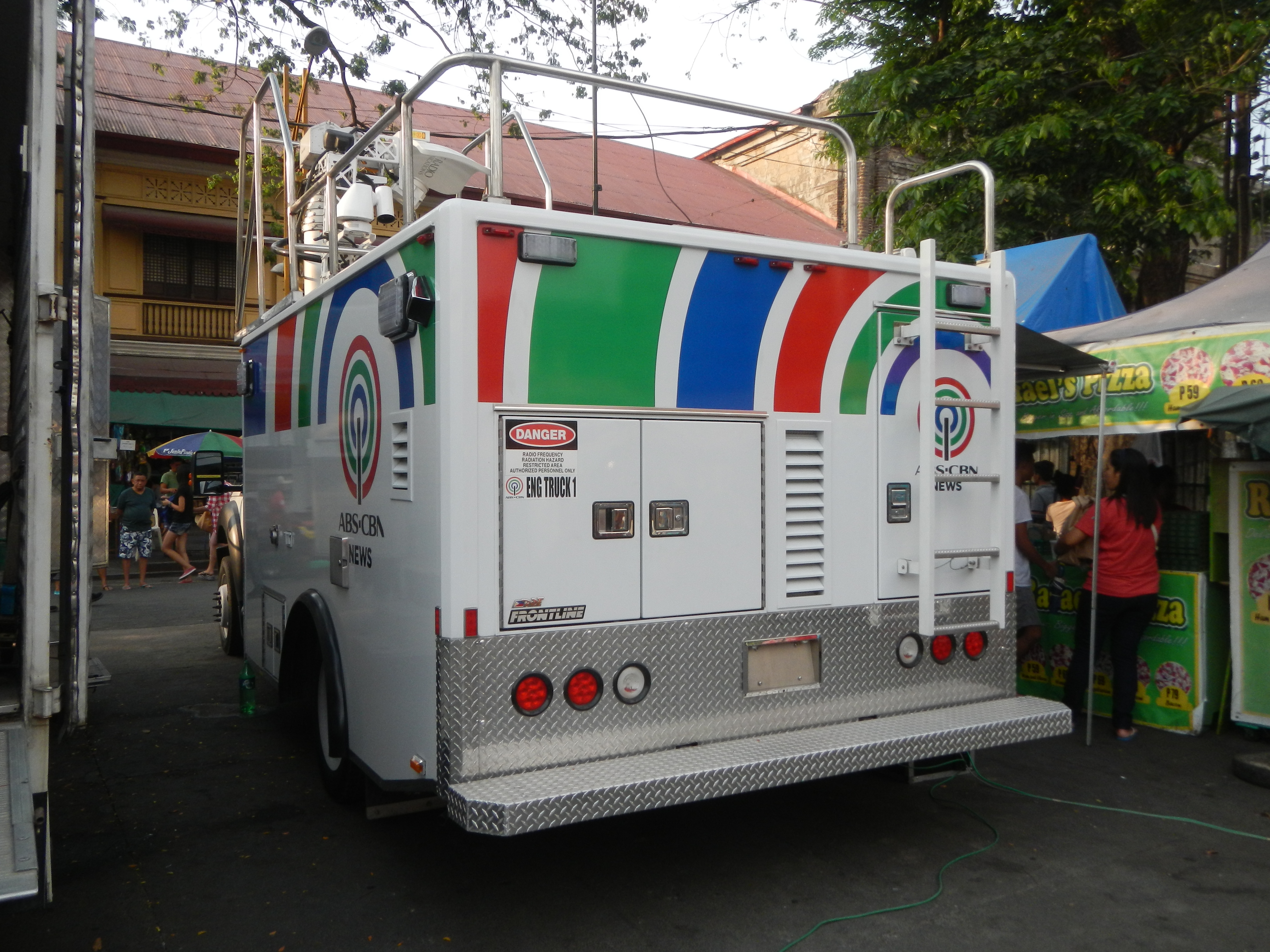
One of next-generation ENG mini-truck fleet of ABS-CBN.

As one cameraman of the era tells it,

One of the very first examples of reliable, news-style video was revealed at the 1968 Democratic National Convention in Chicago. I was a 16mm cameraman at that convention and turned in the street violence one day to eye the first portable "Portapak" video package from Sony in Japan. It was the first truly portable video package I had ever seen and it made quite an impression on me while carrying that back breaking film camera. The Sony Portapak was a two-piece, battery powered, self-contained video tape analog recording system that could be carried and operated by one person. Because earlier "portable" television cameras were so large, heavy and cumbersome, the Portapak made it possible for individuals to record video easily outside the studio.

This portability greatly contributed to the rise of electronic news gathering as it made portable news more easily accessible than ever before.

Early portable video systems recorded at a lower quality than broadcast studio cameras, which made them less desirable than non portable video systems. When the Portapak video camera was introduced in 1967, it was a new method of video recording, forever shifting ENG.

By the time videotape technology advanced, the capability for microwave transmission was well established (and used in the 1960s by the BBC's ill-fated Mobile Film Processing Unit). But the convenience of videotape finally allowed crews to more easily use microwave links to quickly send their footage back to the studio. It even made live feeds more possible, as in the police shootout with the Symbionese Liberation Army in 1974. Also in 1974, KMOX, a station in St. Louis, Mo., was the first to abandon film and switch entirely to ENG. Stations all over the country made the switch over the next decade.

During the mid-to-late 1970s, several companies, such as RCA, Sony, and Ikegami released portable one-piece color television cameras designed for ENG use. These included the RCA TK-76, Sony BVP-300, and the Ikegami HL-79. These cameras became popular with television stations. These cameras utilized vidicon tubes to capture video as solid-state imagers (such as CCDs) would not be practical in broadcasting until the late 1980s. In 1974, Sony introduced the VO-3800 portable 3/4" U-matic videocassette recorder, which was followed up by the BVU-100, BVU-110, and BVU-50 U-matic recorders, which were also popular with broadcasters for ENG use.

ENG greatly reduces the delay between when the footage is captured and when it can be broadcast, thus enabling news gathering and reporting to become steady cycle with little time in between when story breaks and when a story can air. Coupled with live microwave and/or satellite trucks, reporters were able to show live what was happening, bringing the audience into news events as they happened.

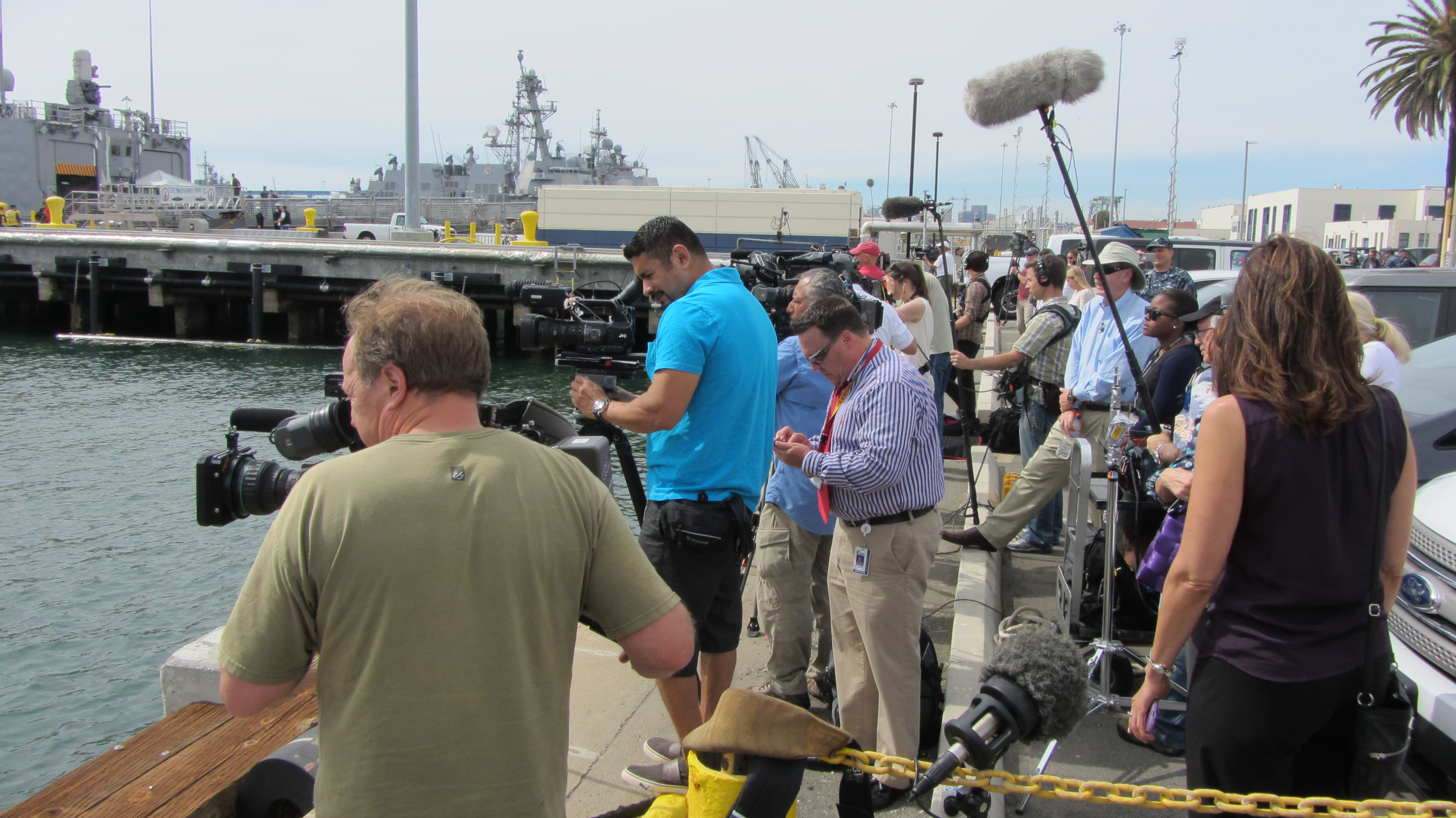
Television broadcast crews line up on a San Diego dock awaiting arrival of USS Vandegrift (FFG-48) crew after the sea rescue of the Kaufman family, 2014

CNN launched in June 1980, as ENG technologies were emerging. The technology was still in its developmental stages, and had yet to be integrated with satellites and microwave relays, which caused some problems with the network's early transmissions. However, ENG proved to be a crucial development for all television news as news content recorded using videocassette recorders was easier to edit, duplicate and distribute. Over time, as editing technology has become simpler and more accessible, video production processes have largely passed from broadcast engineers to producers and writers, making the process quicker.

However, initially the ENG cameras and recorders were heavier and bulkier than their film equivalents. This restricted the ability of camera operators from escaping danger or hurrying toward a news event. Editing equipment was expensive and each scene had to be searched out on the master recording.

== Technology developments ==
Using technology such as multicast or RTP over UDP, these systems achieve similar performance to high end-microwave. Since the video stream is already encoded for IP, the video can be used for traditional television broadcast or Internet distribution without modification (live to air).

As mobile broadband has developed, broadcast devices using this technology have appeared. These devices are often more compact than previous technology and can aggregate multiple mobile data lines to deliver a high definition-quality content live. These devices are known as Digital Mobile News Gathering (DMNG).

== Broadcast video equipment ==
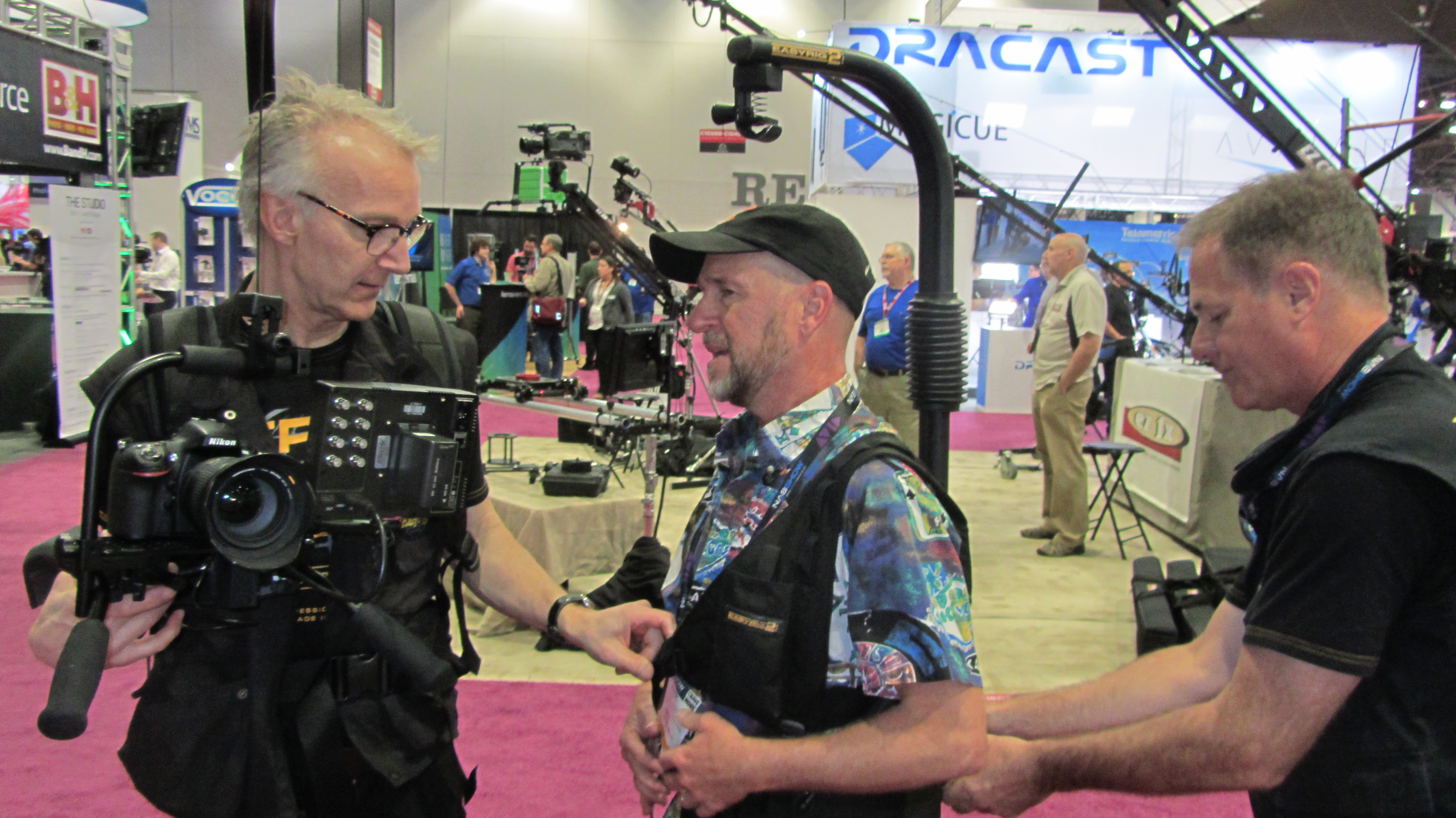
Easyrig Inventor Johan Hellsten with DP Mark Schulze wearing Easyrig at NAB 2015

The ongoing technological evolution of broadcast video production equipment can be observed annually at the NAB Show in Las Vegas where equipment manufacturers gather to display their wares to people within the video production industry. The trend is toward lighter-weight equipment that can deliver more resolution at higher speeds. There has been an evolution from film to standard-definition television, high-definition television and now 4K.

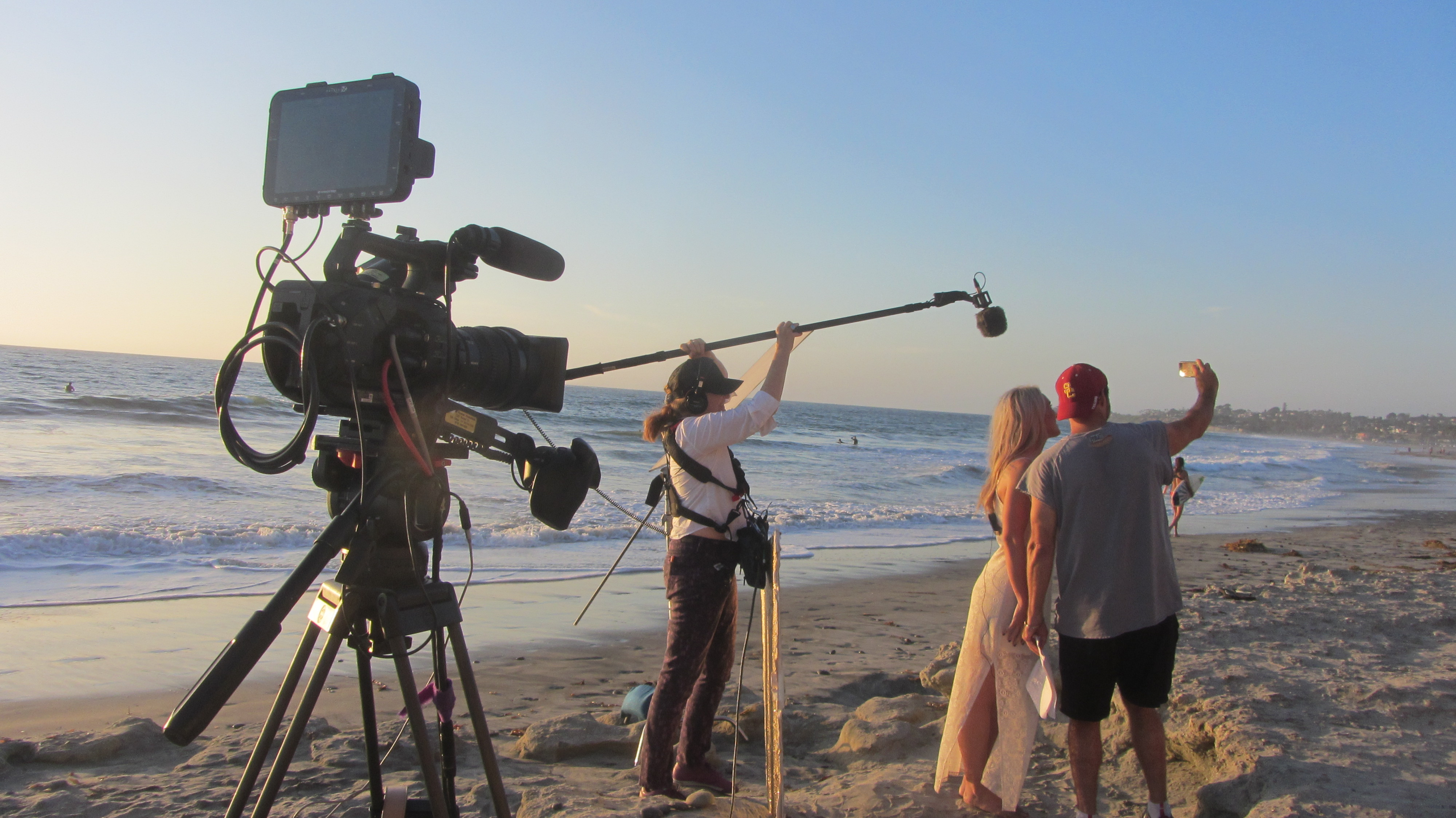
Video production on Carlsbad beach using Sony FS7 camera, Sachtler carbon fiber tripod and Convergent Design Odyssey 7Q+ monitor

As of 2016, highlights included unmanned aerial vehicles aka drones for the delivery of aerial footage, various lines of cameras that can deliver 4K resolution, graphics packages for news stations, which can be utilized inside their microwave and/or satellite vehicles, Wireless technology, POV cameras and peripherals from GoPro and other action camera manufacturers, and the Odyssey 7Q+ monitor with Apollo multi-camera switcher/recorder from Convergent Design. This monitor fits on the back of a broadcast video camera and allows photojournalists to live-switch a multi-camera production in studio or on location.

== Outside broadcasts ==
Outside broadcasts (also known as "remote broadcasts" and "field operations") are when the editing and transmission of the news story are done outside the station's headquarters. Use of ENG has made possible the greater use of outside broadcasts.

"Some stations have always required reporters to shoot their own stories, interviews and even standup reports and then bring that material back to the station where the video is edited for that evening's newscast. At some of these stations, the reporters sometimes even anchor the news and introduce the packages they have shot and edited."

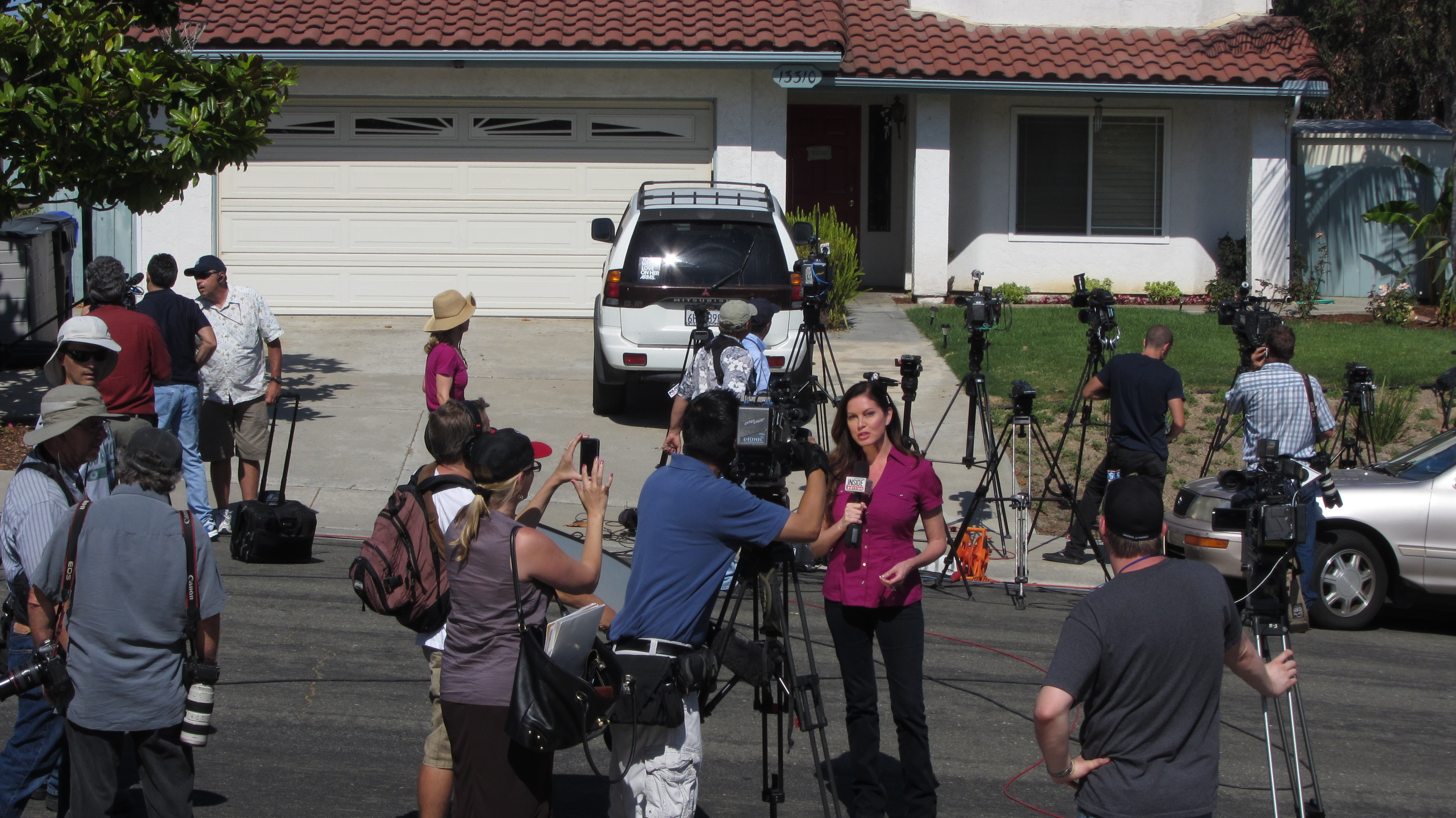
News reporters gather at San Diego home of James Holmes's parents after Colorado theater shooting in Aurora, Colorado, July 2012

Short-form news stories are what local news reporters deliver to their stations. Longer-form stories about the same topics are covered by national or international broadcast news magazines such as Dateline NBC, 20/20, Nightline, 48 Hours, 60 Minutes and Inside Edition. Depending upon the scope of the story, the number of crews vying for position at the story venue (press conference, courthouse, crime location, etc.) can potentially be dozens.

Natural disasters, terrorism, death and murder are topics that reside at the top of the news-gathering hierarchy. For instance, in the U.S., the series of events culminating in what would thereafter be known as 9/11 galvanized every news division of every network.

"Especially on that first day, you were really just going to whomever had a piece of information," said 48 Hours executive producer Susan Zirinsky, whose team produced the primetime coverage that first night. "You were getting cameras up, you were putting people in place, you were trying to wrap your brain around it. You wanted to step back and synthesize some of the information, which is what we were trying to do ... At that point, we thought there were many more dead, and it was still a search-and-rescue mission. It was a very, very complicated day to try to give context to."

"There is a hierarchy of news. It's a hierarchy of judgment, I guess. All deaths are equal to the victims and their families. But all deaths are not equal in the calculation of news value."

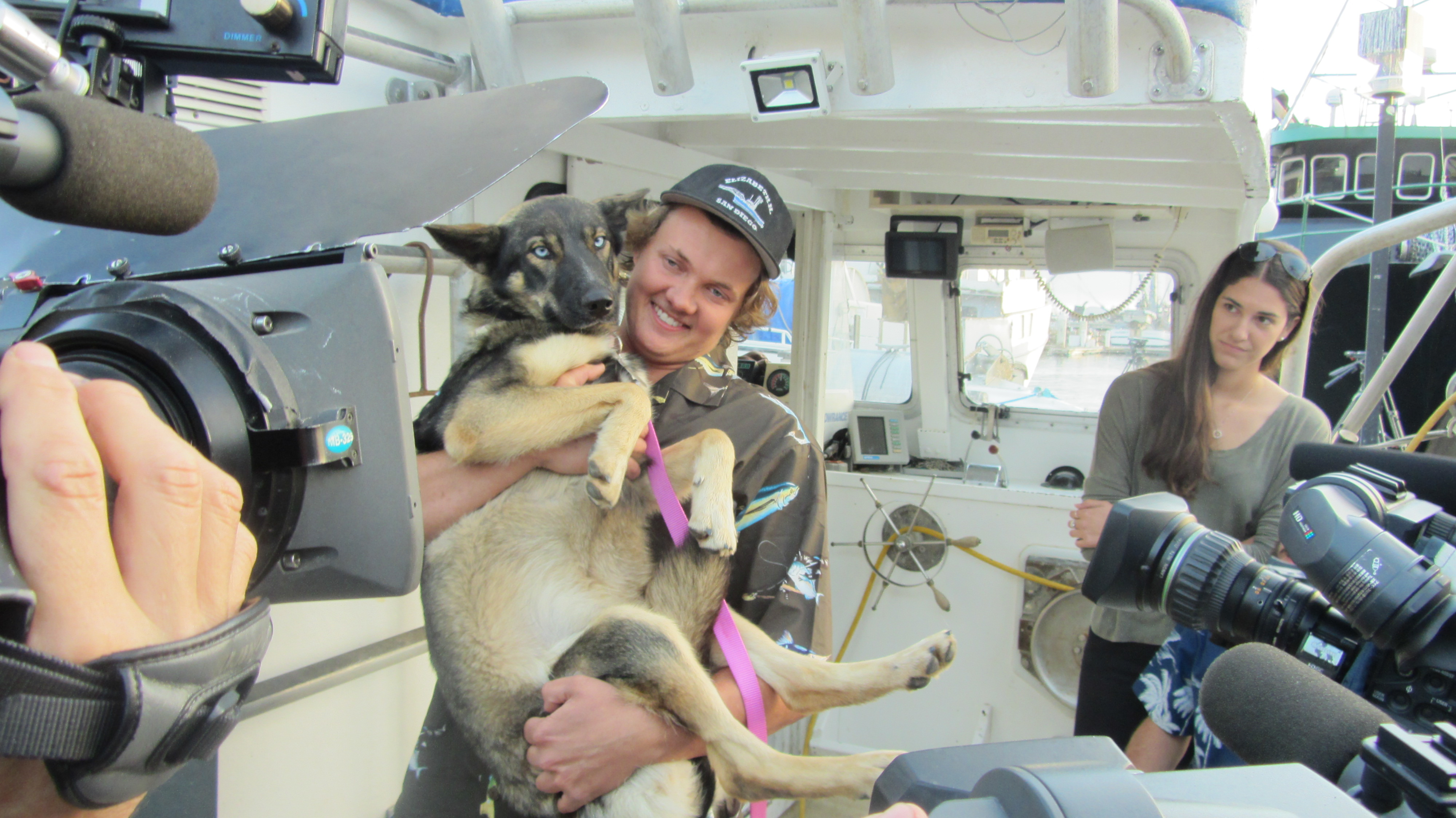
After she was lost at sea near San Clemente Island for five weeks, Luna the dog is reunited with Nick Haworth at San Diego Tuna Fleet Docks, March 2016

"Feel-good stories" such as the saving of a life, or selfless act of kindness, sometimes make their way into the news stream.

== Microwave spectrum channels ==
In the United States, there are ten ENG video channels set aside in each area for terrestrial microwave communications. TV Broadcast Auxiliary Services (BAS) Channel A10 (2483.5-2500 MHz) is only available on a grandfathered basis to TV BAS licensees holding authority to use that channel as of July 10, 1985. However, there is no sunset date to the grandfather rights, and continued use of A10 remains on a protected, co-primary basis with Mobile Satellite Service (MSS) Ancillary Terrestrial Component (ATC) use of 2483.5-2495 MHz. Use of these channels is restricted by federal regulations to those holding broadcast licenses in the given market, to Broadcast Network-Entities, and to Cable Network-Entities. Channels 1 through 7 are in the 2 GHz band and channels 8, 9 and 10 are in the 2.5 GHz band. In Atlanta for example, there are two channels each for the four news-producing television stations (WSB-TV, WAGA-TV, WXIA-TV, WANF), one for CNN, and another open for other users on request, such as Georgia Public Broadcasting.

Traditionally, the Federal Communications Commission has assigned microwave spectrum based on historic patterns of need and through the application/request process. With the other uses of radio spectrum growing in the 1990s, the FCC made available some bands of spectrum as unlicensed channels. This included spectrum for cordless phones and Wi-Fi. As a result, some of these channels have been used for news gathering by websites and more informal news outlets. One major disadvantage of unlicensed use is that there is no frequency coordination, which can result in interference or blocking of signals.

== Audio journalism ==
A common set-up for journalists is a battery operated cassette recorder with a dynamic microphone and optional telephone interface. With this set-up, the reporter can record interviews and natural sound and then transmit these over the phone line to the studio or for live broadcast.

Electronic formats used by journalists have included DAT, MiniDisc, CD and DVD. Minidisc has digital indexing and is re-recordable, reusable medium; while DAT has SMPTE timecode and other synchronization features. In recent years, more and more journalists have used smartphones or iPod-like devices for recording short interviews. The other alternative is using small field recorders with two condenser microphones.

== See also ==
- Electronic field production
- Satellite truck
- Outside broadcasting
- Production truck
