= Recording at the edge =

Recording at the edge is the recording of video and storing it either in camera or to a directly connected storage device instead of transporting it across the network to a centralized recording facility such as a digital video recorder.

Recording at the edge is a distributed or de-centralized approach to storage—the video is spread across a number of edge-storage devices as opposed to centralized on one.

== Network bandwidth-friendly ==
Recording at the edge is a network bandwidth-friendly approach because it does not use any network bandwidth in order to record video—instead the network is only used to play back audio or video from the edge at some review station. When the network includes a WAN or, worse still, the Internet, by definition Recording at the Edge becomes the only way to ensure high quality recordings.

== Reliability ==
Recording at the edge is more reliable because recording is independent of the network's health and degree of congestion. Even if the network grinds to a halt recording continues unaffected. However, you have to be very cautious while only recording at the edge. SD cards in these cameras are continuously filled with data, written over, and over-worked -They burn out very quickly, compared to a normal Hard Drive.

== Simple Deployment ==
Recording at the Edge can be achieved by deploying PC-based DVRs at the edge, however with vulnerable operating systems these are more challenging to maintain than a simple purpose built embedded appliance. Embedded DVRs are better suited to this role, although conventional DVRs traditionally focus on recording, searching and playback than scalable live streaming over the network, which is a primary function of an IP-based CCTV architecture.

== Surveillance System Fault Tolerance ==
One of the concerns about IP-based CCTV is the dependence on the network. In a network outage in a centralized storage model both live video and the ability to record is lost. With Recording at the edge this is less of an issue because network outage only impacts live video.

In a centralized approach, if the central recording station fails, all cameras cease to be recorded. With recording at the edge, if one edge recorder fails then only those cameras connected to that unit stop recording.

== Pre-alarm recording ==
For added security centralized storage is frequently used to record alarm video for easy alarm verification and long-term secure storage. Pre-alarm recording is offered by introducing a buffer in the encoder so that the seconds or minutes of video before and after an alarm can be automatically transmitted to the centralized storage. Because of the huge edge storage capacities of some encoders, ranging from 256 MB to 800 GB, you can continuously record video at high frame rates and high resolutions, and still take advantage of pre-alarm recording. For instance, if you continuously transmit a 1 Mbit/s stream (30 IPS at 4 CIF) to a central recorder in the anticipation that an alarm event will occur, you will consume 1 Mbit/s of network bandwidth, or send about 11 Gigabytes of video data. If, however, you use recording at the edge, and use pre-alarm recording configured to 5 seconds pre- and 10 seconds post-alarm, then assuming 20 alarms per day you will transmit a much lower total of around 40 Megabytes of video. The same 11 GB will still be recorded locally but only 40 MB, or 0.4% of it, will touch the network.

In those instances where the pre-alarm video is not long enough, it is comforting to know that the original complete video is always available, recorded at the edge.

== Dual Streaming ==
In situations where the network bandwidth is severely limited, recording at the edge is a savior for high quality recorded video but it does not solve the challenge of needing to view live video over a restricted network. Some encoders support dual streaming. This is a concept that enables the encoder to deliver two totally independent streams of video, separately configured for different frame rates and video resolutions. Typically for limited bandwidth networks one high quality stream is used for local recording, and a lower quality, which translates to a lower bit rate, is used for viewing live. Conversely for high bandwidth networks, the same stream will be used to record locally and centrally, and Automatic Network Replenishment is used to fill any gaps in the centralized recording dues to network interruptions.

== Economies of Scale ==
A major justification for centralized storage is that we can use enormous RAID disk arrays, reducing the cost per terabyte. These cost savings must be balanced against the advantages above. The ideal solution is to seamlessly combine both approaches—when the network bandwidth is available and reliable then use it, but when it is severely limited or intermittent, then use recording at the edge.

== System Management ==
Another significant benefit of centralized systems is the relative simplicity of system management, because everything is co-located in one room or data center rather than dispersed across hundreds or thousands of miles. For recording at the edge to be a pragmatic solution it is critical to include centralized health monitoring and associated system management utilities. These include SNMP compatibility to network management systems such as Tivoli and HP Open View, and the ability to reconfigure and upgrade multiple units simultaneously.

== Digital video recorders in recording at the edge ==
Analog-to-DVR systems do not offer edge recording. This is because the analog cameras must first record to a central DVR; the video is then compressed into a digital format, and then stored typically on a hard drive inside the unit. All of this must be done before it can record to SD or attached hard drive.

IP Camera systems on the other hand do not require analog to digital conversion so can record digital video directly to SD cards inside the camera, or to attached hard drive.
