= Electronic field production =

Video production which takes place outside a television studio

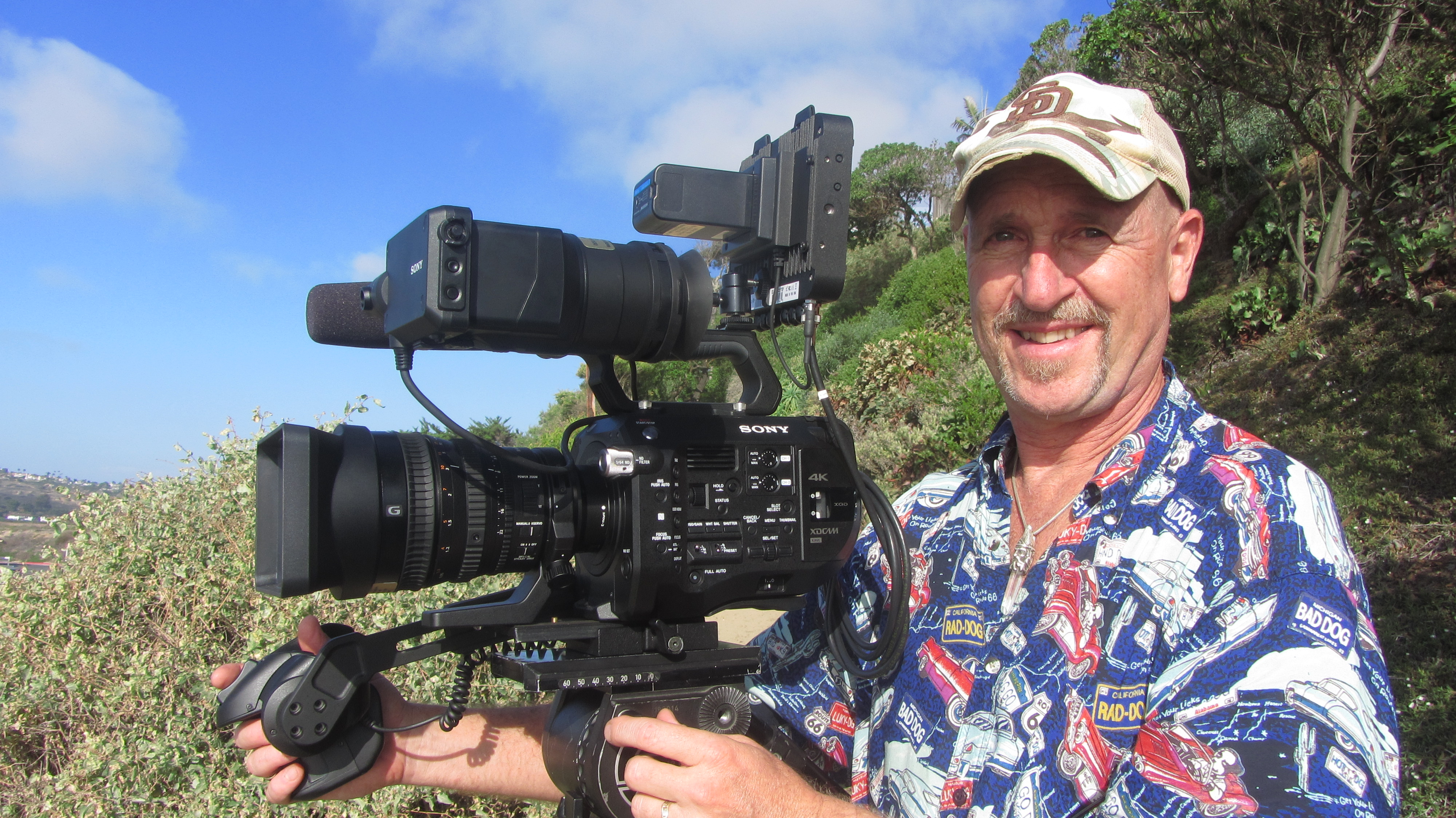
Director of Photography with Sony FS7 camera and Convergent Design Odyssey 7Q+ recorder monitor, a video production rig used for ENG and EFP shoots

Electronic field production (EFP) is a television industry term referring to a video production which takes place in the field, outside of a formal television studio, in a practical location, special venue or fitting environment. Zettl defines EFP as using "both ENG (electronic news gathering) and studio techniques. From ENG it borrows its mobility and flexibility; from the studio it borrows its production care and quality control. EFP takes place on location (which may include shooting in someone's living room) and has to adapt to the location conditions... Good lighting and audio are always difficult to achieve in EFP, regardless of whether you are outdoors or indoors. Compared to ENG, in which you simply respond to a situation, EFP needs careful planning."

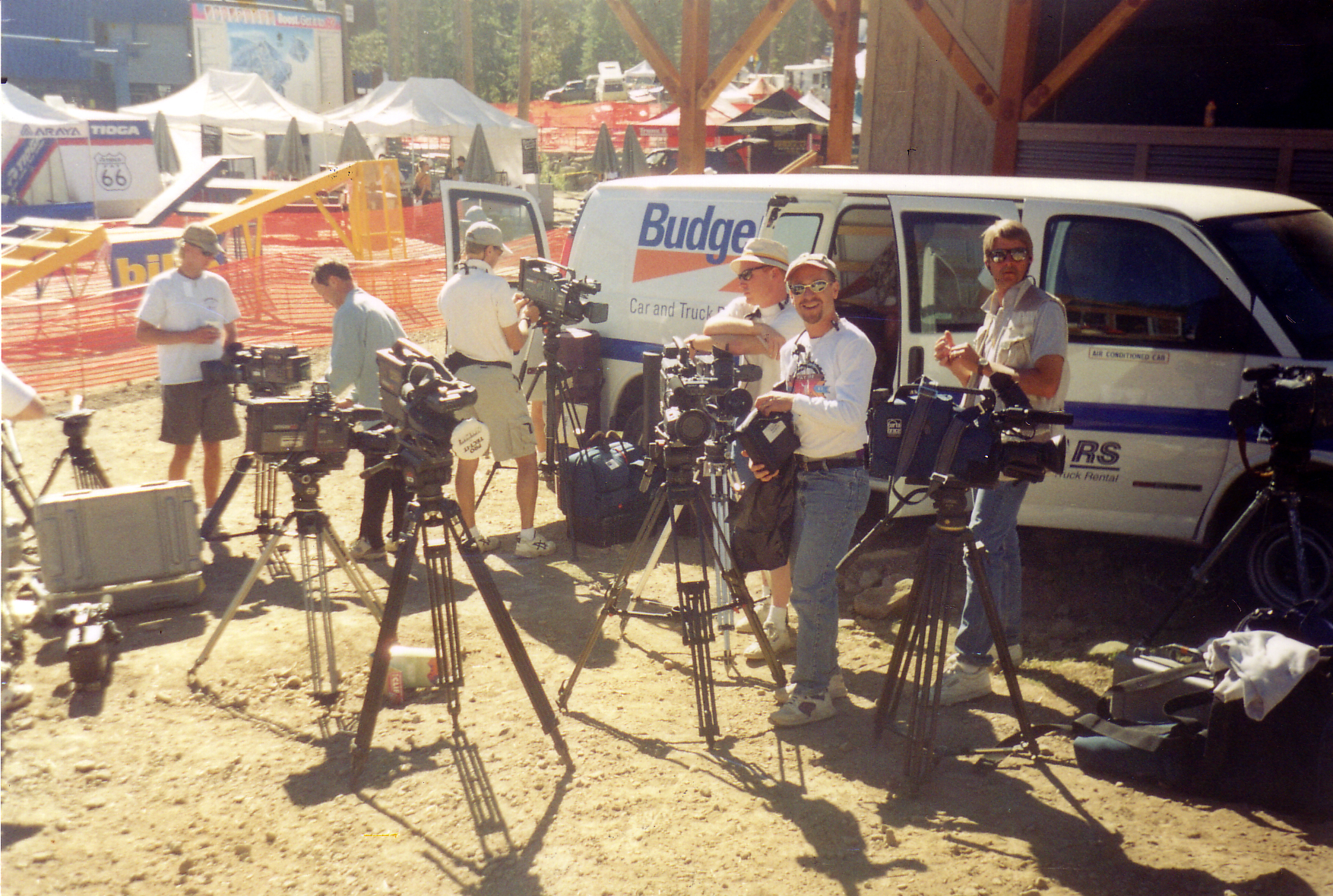
Multi-camera exterior EFP shoot at a BMX Rally, California, 2004

Typical applications of electronic field production include awards shows, concerts, major interviews for news magazine shows like Inside Edition, Extra and Dateline NBC, large conventions such as the Democratic National Convention, Republican National Convention or San Diego Comic-Con, celebrity red-carpet events and sporting events.

EFP ranges from a camera operator or crew of two (camera operator with sound mixer) capturing high-quality imagery, to a multiple-camera setup utilizing videography, photography, advanced graphics and sound.

== Sports ==
Sports television is one facet of EFP. Major television networks once owned their own production trucks for covering major events, but today, with the explosion in networks on cable and over-the-air, they rent television production trucks by the day or week from broadcast rental companies for more routine or remote broadcast productions.

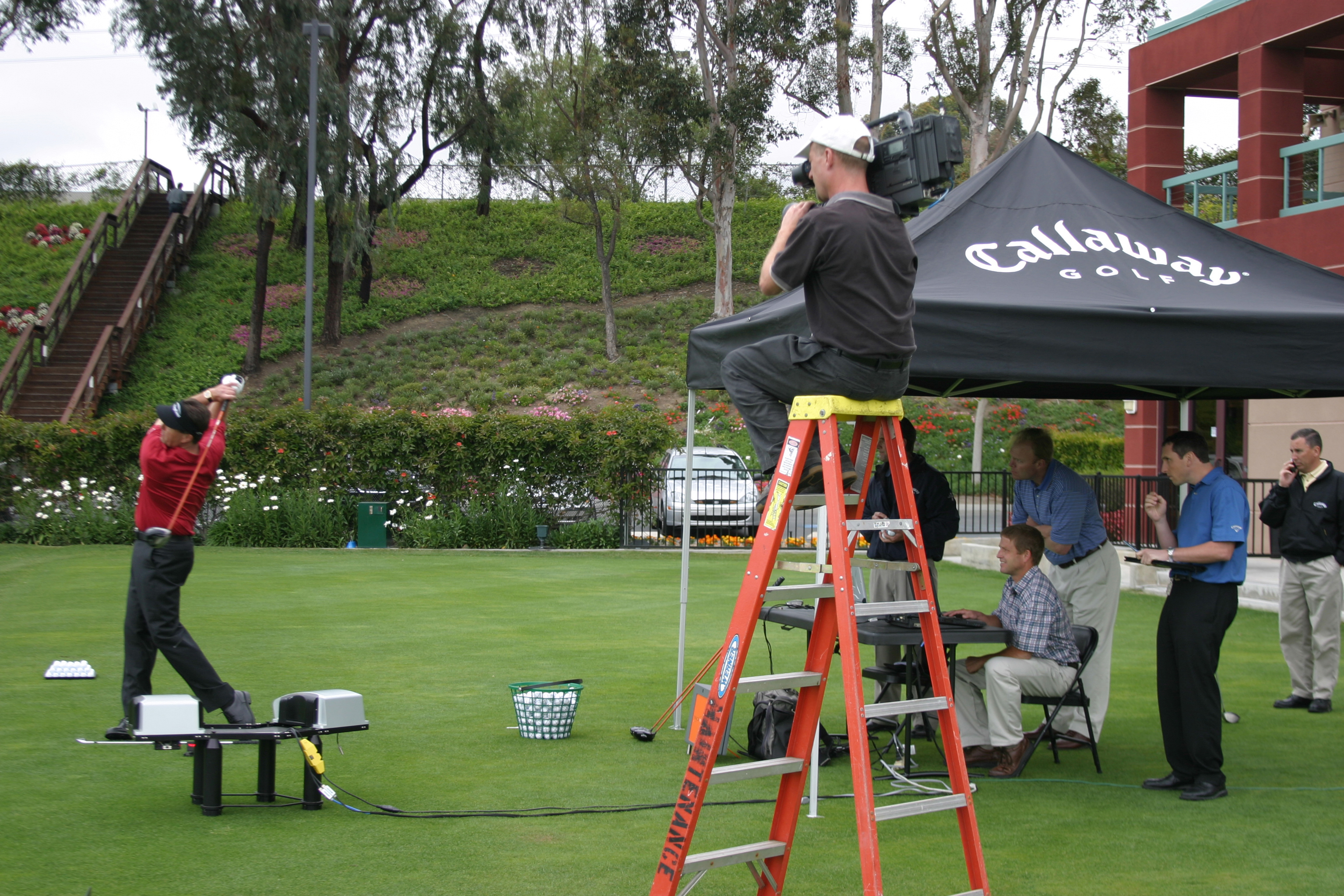
A cameraman videotapes golf pro Phil Mickelson at Callaway hand-held with a Sony Betacam SP camera, 2005

A typical sports production truck includes:

- A large video switcher with an external digital video effects (DVE) unit and several mix/effect busses, to allow the Television director flexibility in calling for certain visual effects in the broadcast.
- Several tripod-mounted and handheld professional video cameras.
- A variety of zoom lenses for the tripod-mounted "hard" cameras, typically at least 50× to 100× magnification, and a maximum focal length of at least 600mm. The extreme amount of magnification is necessary because the cameras can be located quite a distance from the action.
- Several video recording and playback devices such as VCRs, hard disk recorders and video servers. Certain cameras or video feeds can be "isolated" to specific decks, and when something happens that the producer or director wants to see again, the deck can be rewound and shown on the air as an instant replay. Hard disk recorders typically allow some limited editing capabilities, allowing highlight reels to be edited together in the middle of a game.
- Several character generators allowing scores and statistics to be shown on screen. The scoreboards used in most sports facilities can be linked to the truck to drive the television production's graphics as well as the arena scoreboards.
- An audio mixing console booth and a variety of microphones to capture audio from the sports commentators and from the field of play.
- Several miles of various types of cable.

== Television news magazines ==
Television news magazines are longer and more in-depth TV programming than shorter "breaking news" clips that focus on an issue in a documentary style. They are driven by interviews of people who are directly involved in the topic covered and last for from 30 minutes to three hours.

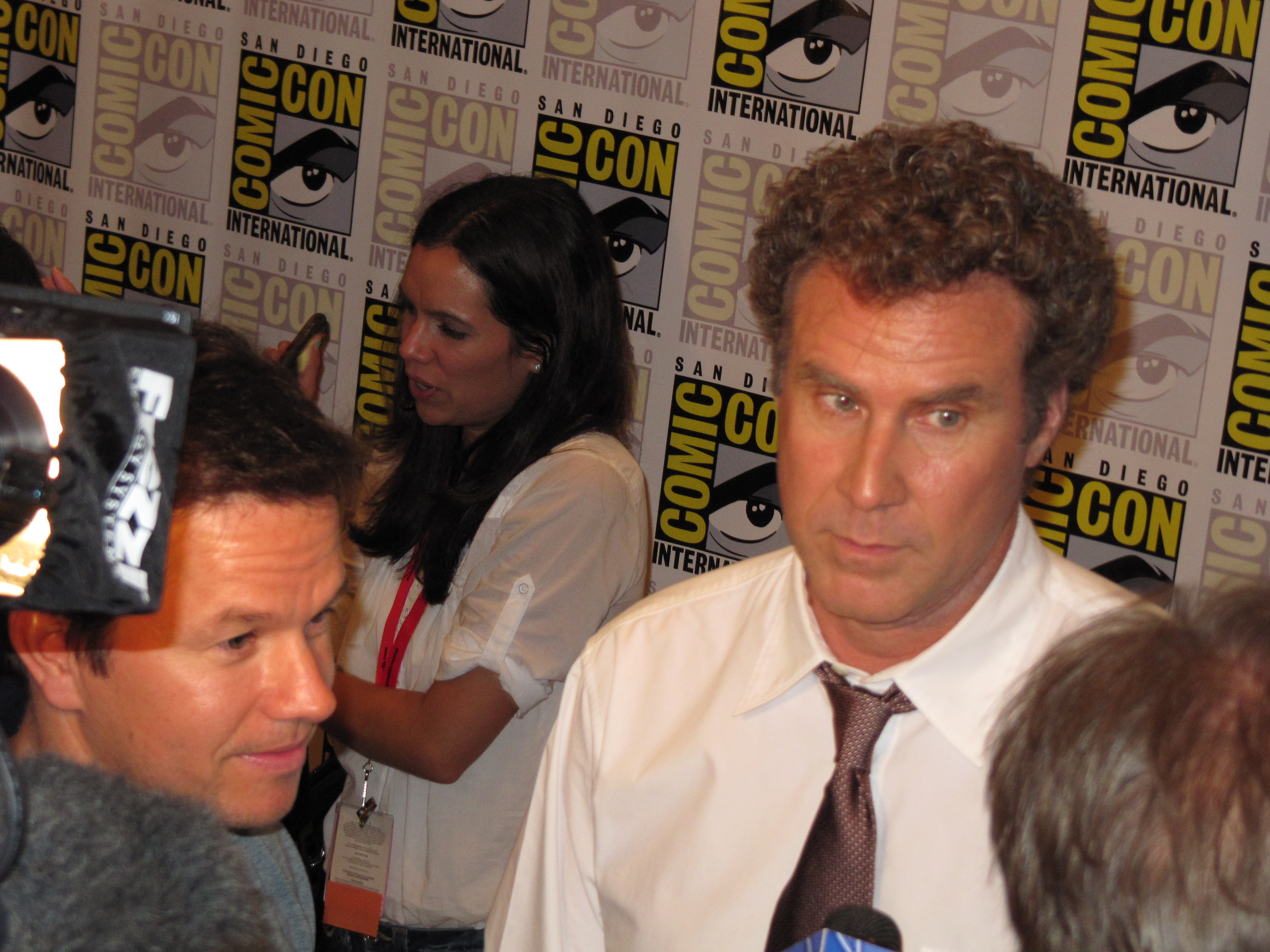
Mark Wahlberg and Will Ferrell in the Press Room, San Diego Comic Con 2010

The first known television news magazine was Panorama on the BBC in 1953. Since then, the genre rose in popularity through the years including CBS’s 60 Minutes, debuting in 1968. Its spin-off, 60 Minutes II, debuted in 1999.

Electronic Field Production for a typical news magazine story may include one or several interviews with B-roll gathered typically by a three-person crew (producer, camera operator and audio technician/boom-pole operator). Locations vary. Typically the crew shoots the interview at the home or workplace of the interviewee. They may also go to additional locations that are a backdrop to the story. Lighting and shooting style are consistent with each's show's "look" or criteria.

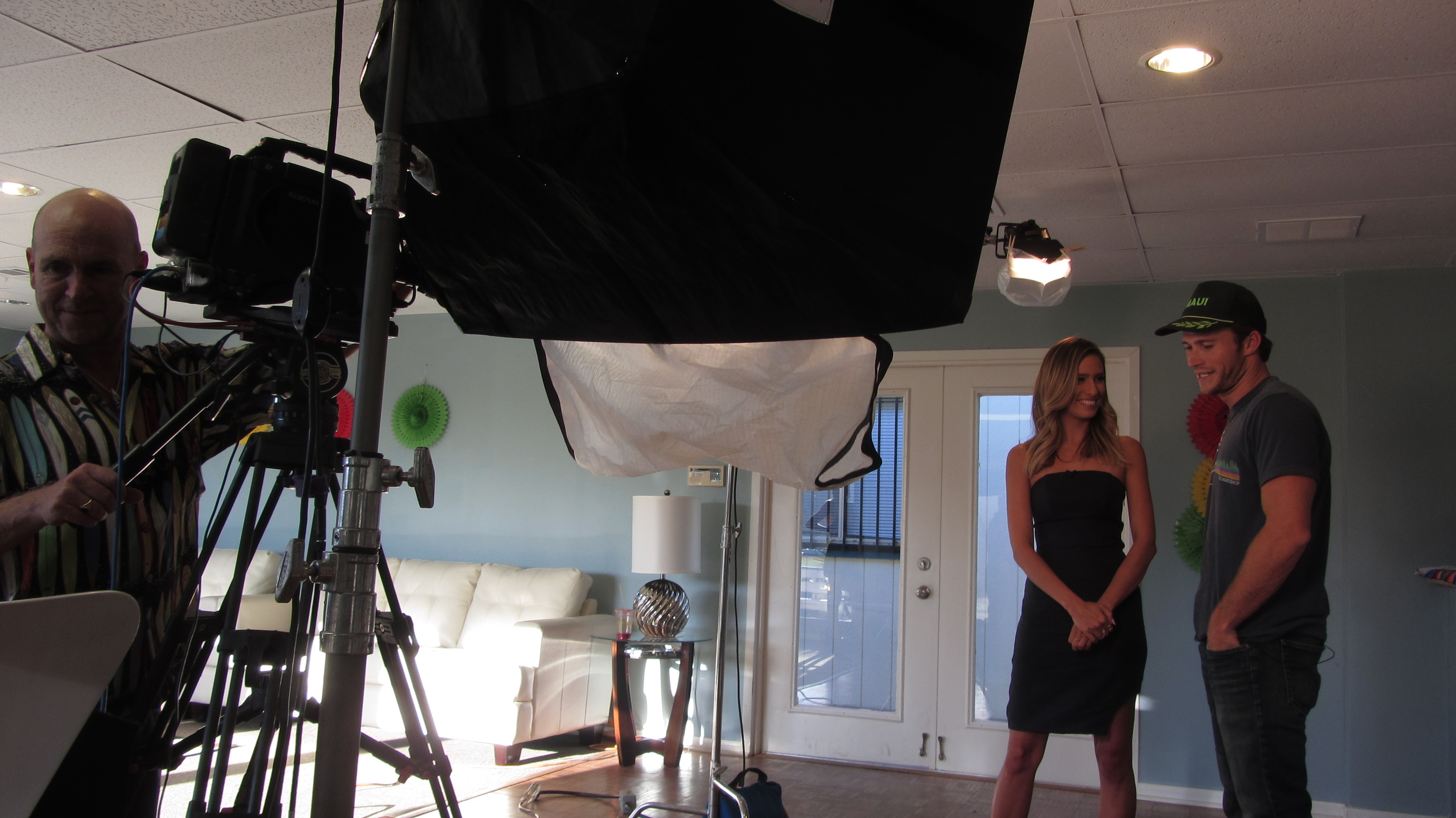
Electronic Field Production shoot for Extra with on screen talent Scott Eastwood and Renee Bargh

After the interviews and B-Roll have been gathered, the producer may either hand-deliver the media to the studio, ship it by messenger service or a shipping company, or "feed it" in real time via a local satellite service.

== Related techniques ==
- Contrasted with the production values of EFP, in electronic journalism or electronic news-gathering (ENG), the emphasis is on quickness and agility in acquisition and rapidity in the process of editing, leading to final transmission to the audience as the goal. The two terms are often seen paired as EFP-ENG and vice versa.
- Many episodic television shows, four-camera situation comedy, and television drama, such as PBS' Masterpiece Theatre, all draw upon forms of EFP.

== See also ==
- Electronic journalism
- Electronic news-gathering (ENG)
- Outside broadcasting (OB)
- Remote broadcast
- Television crew
- Television studies
