= TeleMation Inc. =

Television production equipment company

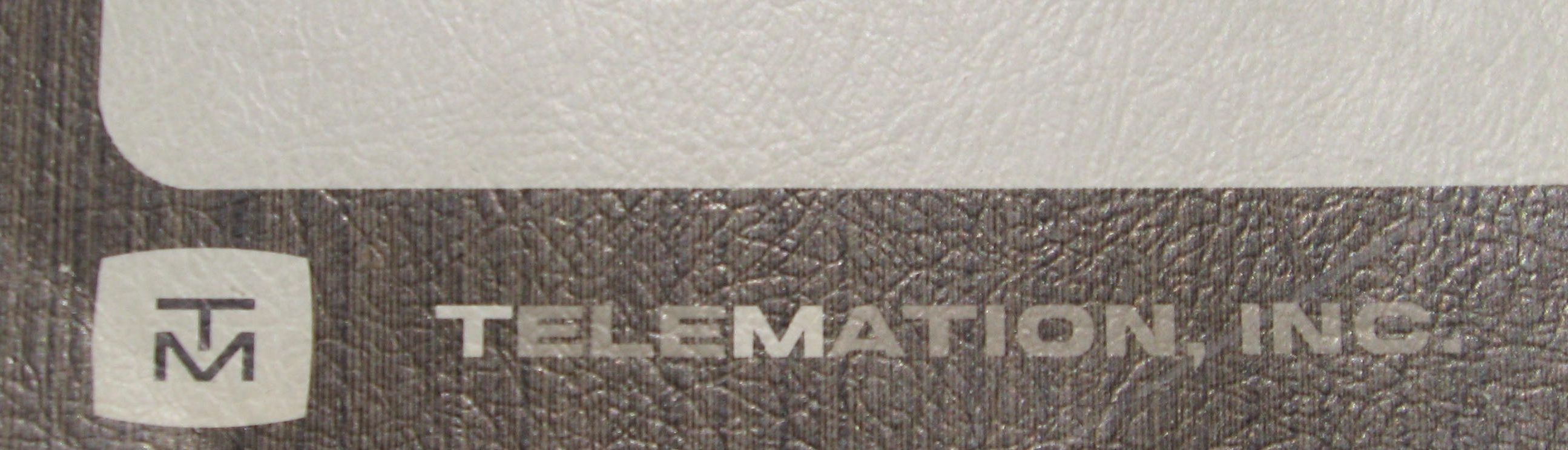
- Company type: Private company
- Industry: Electronics
- Founded: 1954
- Founder: Lyle Oscar Keys and John W. Gallivan
- Defunct: 1977
- Fate: Acquired
- Successor: Bell and Howell
- Headquarters: Salt Lake City, Utah, United States
- Products: Video equipment
- Owner: Thomson SA

TeleMation was an American company specializing in products for the television industry, post-production and film industry, located in Salt Lake City, Utah. TeleMation started with a line of black-and-white video equipment, and later manufactured color video products. Lyle Keys was the founder and president of TeleMation, Inc., started in the late 1960s. Early equipment was for the black-and-white broadcast, cable television, and CCTV market.

It was acquired by Bell and Howell in 1977 and the brand continued to be used under a number of different owners until the business was bought by French electronics company, Thomson SA in 2002.

== History ==
In 1954, Lyle Oscar Keys was an itinerant equipment salesman from Wibaux, Montana. John F. Fitzpatrick was president of The Salt Lake Tribune at the time. Fitzpatrick's assistant John W. Gallivan hired Keys as an engineer for KUTV Channel 2, of which the Tribune was part owner. In a time when the electronics industry was burgeoning, Keys knew how to get essential parts fast in a time when these parts were unavailable or slow to get. By 1962, the Tribune's owner, Kearns-Tribune Corporation, and their partners in KUTV organized Electronic Sales Corporation (ELCO) to help meet these needs. Keys was installed as president with an office in the Kearns Building in Salt Lake City.

Within eight years, the company, which had been incorporated as Telemation, had 420 employees, producing and marketing 156 products for the television industry with annual sales of $10 million. It became the nation's largest supplier of closed circuit TV systems and developed scores of proprietary items for cable television, industrial, educational and commercial TV.

Keys personally conceptualized many of the firm's products, helped engineer them, produced millions of dollars in sales, and even wrote Telemation's news releases and advertising copy. He also laid out the blueprint for the company's development of 84,000 square feet (7,800 m^{2}) of space in southwest Salt Lake County's technological park.

The Kearns-Tribune Corporation's interest in this publicly owned enterprise as of early 1971 was 24.5%.

- In 1977, TeleMation inc. became a division of Bell and Howell.
- In October 1979, Bell and Howell entered a joint venture with Robert Bosch GmbH, Bosch's Fernseh Division, called Fernseh Inc. Bosch Fernseh Division was located in Darmstadt, Germany and for many years manufactured a full line of video and film equipment, professional video camera, VTR and Telecine, under Robert Bosch Fernsehanlagen GmbH.
- In April 1982, Bosch fully acquired Fernseh Inc., renaming the company Robert Bosch Corporation, Fernseh Division.
- In 1986, Bosch entered into a new joint venture with Philips Broadcast in Breda, Netherlands. This new company was called Broadcast Television Systems Inc. (BTS). Philips had been in the broadcast market for many years with a line of Norelco professional video cameras and other products.
- In 1995, Philips Electronics North America Corp. fully acquired BTS Inc., renaming it Philips Broadcast – Philips Digital Video Systems.
- In March 2001, this division was sold to Thomson SA, the current owner; the division was called Thomson Multimedia.
- In 2002, the French electronics giant Thomson SA also acquired the Grass Valley Group from Tektronix in Beaverton, Oregon, US.
- Grass Valley was sold to Belden on February 6, 2014. Belden also owns Miranda.

== Products ==
- Various Telemation B&W video products
- TSE-200 Special Effects Generator
- TPC-100 Porta-Studio
- TMV-529 Waveform Sampler
- TMV-708 Camera Control Unit
- TMC 2100 Camera
- TVM-650 Multicaster Switcher – vision mixer
- TMM-203 Film Chain-Multiplexer – Film Island
- TMU-100 Uniplexers
- TVM-550 video distribution amplifier
- TPA-550 Pulse distribution amplifier
- AP C.A.T.V. Character Generators (using Teletype machine and video camera) (1965)
- A line of Character Generators
- Automation equipment, like the BCS 2000
- Digital Noise Reducer, also called Digital Noise Filter, 1984
- TVU-175 Ventilation Unit
- Some color products (made in Salt Lake City under various brands)
- TVS-1000 TAS-1000 routers and line of party line control panels
  - Phone remote router control interface
- MCS 2000 Master Control Switch – vision mixer
- MC Machine Control
- TSG-550 Sync Generator
- Tmt-101 Stairstep Generator
- Tmt-102 Multiburst Generator
- Tmt-103 Sin Pulse/Window Generator
- Compositor character generator
- TCF-3000 Color film chain-Multiplexer – Film Island
- Digital Encoder Pal and NTSC
- Mach One Editor (acquired) – a Non-linear editing system
- Alamar Automation (acquired)
- TVS-2000 router and line of party line Control panels with and w/o mnemonic displays
- CE 2200 party line controller, CE 2500
- Status Display
- TVS-3000 router
- Venus router
- BCS 3000 HP UNIX Based controller – VG 3000 VGS card
- Jupiter Controller – Windows-based router control system
  - VM 3000 VGA Status Display, V board
  - SC 3000 Serial Control Interface S board
  - CE 3000 Matrix Controller, M board – can support 3 level switching and other brands
  - ES 3000 ESnet Interface
  - PL 3000 party line Controller
  - SI 3000 Control Processor
- Jupiter Control panels: CP 3200, CP 3300, CP 3310, CP 3320
- Jupiter XPress, CM4000
- Trinix router, DM–33100
- Saturn Master Control Switch

Weather Channel 97

- Mars
- SDR–400
- GS–400
- FGS 4000 3D Character – Graphic Generator – Computer-generated imagery
- Vidifont Character generator (acquired from Thomson SA)
- The Media Pool – disk recorder

== Trivia ==
Fernseh is German for "television". In German the words fern and seh literally mean "far" and "see", respectively.

Because of all the mergers, customers sometimes fondly called these company(ies): Tele-bella-bosch-a-mation.

Thomson still operates offices in the cities of all these acquisitions:

- Cergy, France (Thomson World Headquarters)
- Salt Lake City, Utah, US – from TeleMation Inc
- Beaverton, Oregon, US – from Tektronix
- Nevada City, California, US – from Grassvalley Group
- Breda, the Netherlands – from Philips-Norelco
- Weiterstadt – Darmstadt, Germany – from Bosch Fernseh

Awards:

- Outstanding Achievement in Technical/Engineering Development Awards from National Academy of Televisio Arts and Sciences
  - 1966–1967: Plumbicon Tube – N.V. Philips
  - 1987–1888: FGS 4000 computer animation system – BTS – SLC, UT
  - 1992–1993: Prism Technology for Color Television Cameras – N.V. Philips
  - 1993–1994: Controlled Edge Enhancement Utilizing Skin Hue KeyingBTS and Ikegami (joint award)
  - 1997–1998: Development of a High Resolution Digital Film Scanner Eastman Kodak and Philips Germany
  - 2000–2001: Pioneering developments in shared video-data storage systems for use in television video servers – Thomson/Philips – SLC, UT
  - 2002–2003: Technology to simultaneously encode multiple video qualities and the corresponding metadata to enable real-time conformance and / or playout of the higher quality video (nominally broadcast) based on the decisions made using the lower quality proxiesMontage. Philips and Thomson.

== Telemation Productions ==
Telemation Productions was a post-production house in Seattle, Washington; Chicago, Illinois; Phoenix, Arizona; and Denver, Colorado in the 1970s and early 80s. Offices were sold or closed in the late 1980s.

Telemation Productions was started as a marketing tool by Telemation Inc. in the early 1970s. It started as a single office located in Glenview, Illinois, a suburb of Chicago. In 1978, a second office was opened in Denver. Also in 1978, the television equipment manufacturing operation was sold to Bell & Howell. At that time, Telemation Inc. owned only the two production facilities and the manufacturing building in Salt Lake City, which was leased to Bell & Howell. In 1979 Telemation acquired a production facility in Seattle and renamed it Telemation Productions. In the early 1980s, Telemation acquired a facility in Phoenix, also renaming it Telemation Productions. In the early 1980s, Telemation Productions added a distribution division located in Chicago which provided duplication and shipping services to advertising agencies and a mobile division equipped with a television remote truck. Telemation Productions ownership changed in 1987 and again in 1990, with the Home Shopping Network buying the company. The Phoenix office and distribution division were sold in 1989 prior to this acquisition. The remote truck was sold in 1990. The Seattle office was closed in 1991, the Chicago office was closed in 1993, and the Denver office was closed the following year.
