= Triaxial cable =

Electrical cable

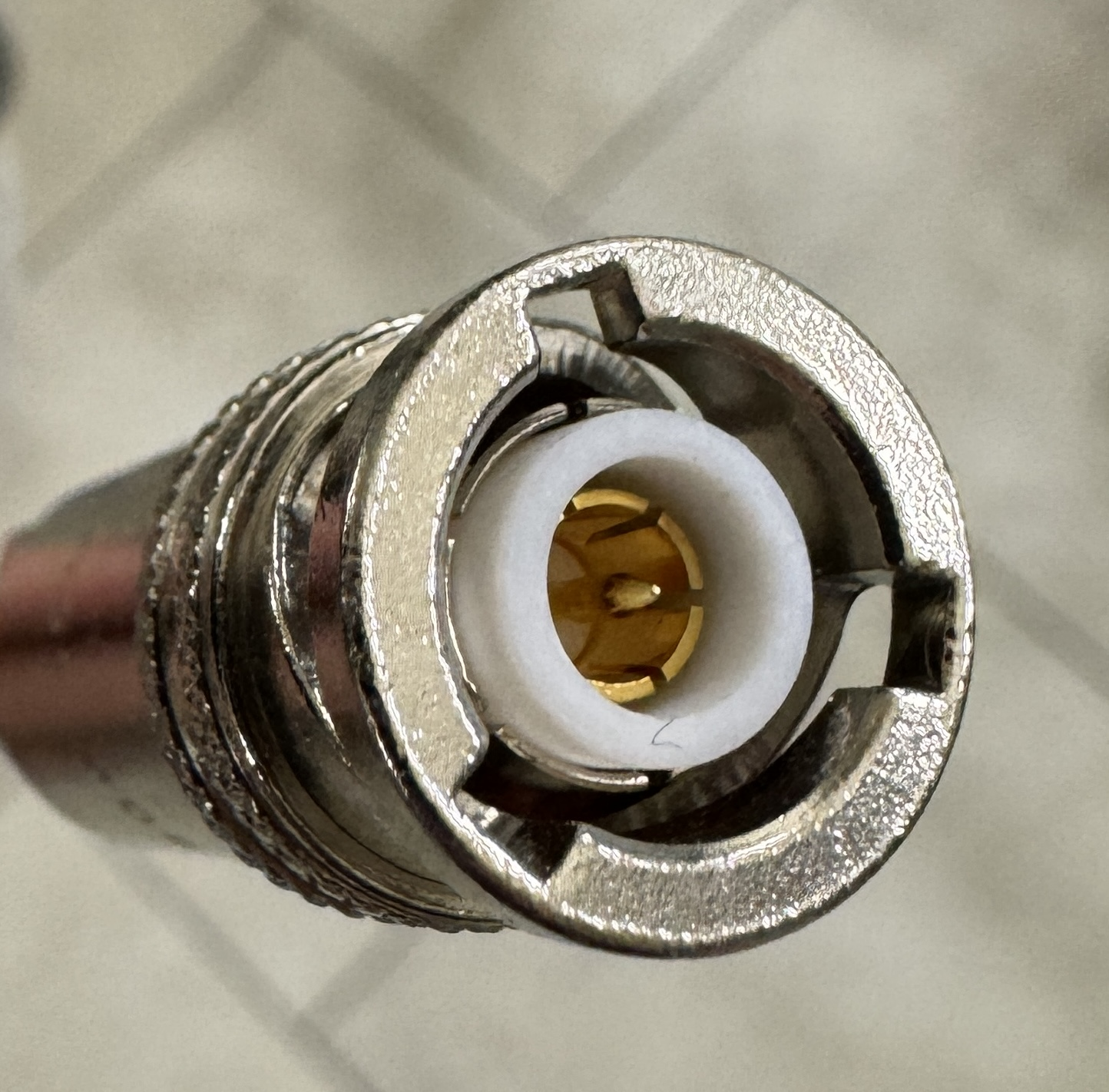
Triaxial BNC connector, typically used on precision electrical measurement equipment.

Triaxial cable, often referred to as triax for short, is a type of electrical cable similar to coaxial cable, but with the addition of an extra layer of insulation and a second conducting sheath. Triax provides greater bandwidth and rejection of interference than coax, but is more expensive.

== Applications ==
=== Television production ===
The most common use of triaxial cable is in television industry as a connecting cable between a camera and its camera control unit (CCU). The outer sheath is commonly used as a protective earth conductor. The core provides both power and signal connections, with the return for the power being provided through the inner screen. Through frequency-division multiplexing, the camera can send audio and video signals along the triax while the CCU can send camera control information, such as exposure settings, intercom, return audio and video (usually that of the program), and tally (a signal alerting the operator that their camera is on the air).

Venues that host television productions fairly often, such as sports arenas, will usually have triaxial cables run from the location of the TV truck to common camera locations throughout the building. This is convenient for visiting television crews, who can simply plug into existing cable runs instead of having to run their own cables and remove them after the broadcast.

- In 1992 N.V. Philips, Breda received the Outstanding Achievement in Technical/Engineering Development Award from the National Academy of Television Arts & Sciences for Triaxial cable Technology for Color Television Cameras. Also see Norelco and BTS

=== Decline of triax in television ===
With the increasing bandwidth requirements of developments such as 4K/UHDTV, HFR (high frame rate) and HDR (high dynamic range) the use of triax is declining in the TV industry. Most of the recently developed broadcast cameras from the leading manufacturers have hybrid single-mode fibre and copper power cores which supersede the older triax connectivity. The advantages of the hybrid copper/fibre over triax cable are noise immunity due to the optical isolation and extremely high bandwidth.

=== Precision current measurements ===
Another application for triaxial cables is for probes taking precision low-current measurements where the leakage current through the insulator between the core and shield would normally alter the measurements. The core (known as the force) and the inner shield (known as the guard) are kept at approximately the same electrical potential by a voltage buffer/follower, thus the leakage current between them is zero for all practical purposes, despite the imperfections of the insulation. Instead, the leakage current occurs between the inner and outer shields, which does not matter since that current will be supplied by the buffer circuit rather than the device under test and will not affect measurements. This technique can provide almost perfect elimination of leakage current but becomes less effective at very high frequencies as the buffer cannot follow the measured voltage accurately.

== See also ==
- Twinaxial cabling
- Coaxial cable
