= Tally light =

Small signal-lamp on a professional video camera or monitor

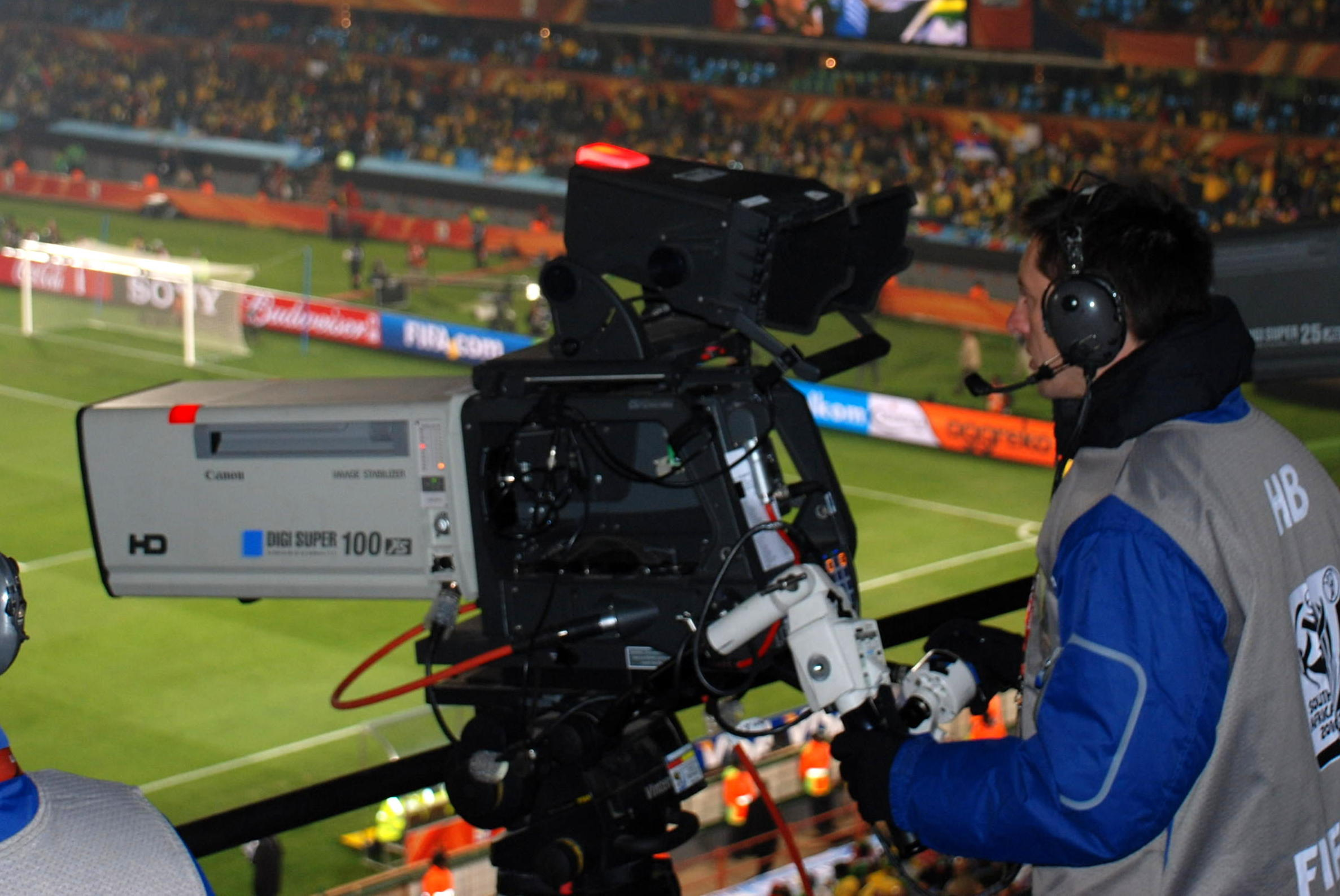
Camera filming a football match with tally light illuminated

In a television studio, a tally light (or on air indicator) is a small signal lamp on a professional video camera or monitor. It is usually located just above the lens or on the electronic viewfinder (EVF) and communicates, for the benefit of those in front of the camera as well as the camera operator, that the camera is live (i.e. its signal is being used for the main program at that moment).

Many non-studio (i.e. intended for offline recording) video cameras—and even digital cameras (such as the Nikon Z50II) capable of filming video—also feature some sort of recording indication.

For television productions with more than one camera in a multiple-camera setup, the tally lights are generally illuminated automatically by a vision mixer trigger that is fed to a tally breakout board and then to a special video router designed for tally signals. The video switcher keeps track of which video sources are selected by the technical director and output to the main program bus. A switch automatically closes the appropriate electrical contacts to create a circuit, which activates the tally unit located in the camera control units (CCU).

If more than one camera is on-air simultaneously (as in the case of a dissolve transition), during the duration of the transition the tally lights of both cameras will remain lit until transition completion. This is also the case when multiple cameras are placed in rectangles on screen, sometimes referred to as picture-in-picture (PiP) mode.

== Colours and usage ==
In the active (on air) mode, tally lights are typically red.

Some cameras and video switchers are capable of additionally showing a preview tally signal (typically green) for when the camera is about to be switched to and become the main source of video signal. Once the switch happens, green changes to red. This feature allows the presenter to be aware of the upcoming transition, and, for example, change their posture.

In addition to the tally lights, an additional light called ISO is sometimes used. ISO is the abbreviation for isolated, and it indicates that the video signal is being recorded separately. When the camera's signal isn't used for the main program but is being recorded for later video editing, a yellow light indicates to the camera operator that the content might be used at a later stage. So, although not “on air,” the operator should try to avoid sudden moves, focus changes, etc. The ISO content is typically used for B-roll shots, such as people's reactions when it's uncertain if, when, and how they will react.

== Implementations ==
Some cameras include dedicated tally lights built into their bodies. In that case, the camera typically provides an input terminal for controlling the indicator. The common interfaces are SDI, Ethernet, USB, and HDMI (the latter's main role is outputting the video signal, but it can also accept a number of control commands).

Alternatively, a tally light can be a separate device mounted on the camera body, lens, or tripod, but not connected to the camera electronically.

In some (mainly non-studio) cameras, the tally light is implemented as a special UI element displayed on the screen (e.g. red outline around the frame).

In broadcast and recording studios, tally lights are used to alert the talent that studio microphones are live (or recording). Tally lights are also installed outside the studio doors, to prevent anyone attempting to enter the studio during the live program or recording in progress. Some broadcast consoles can also provide an output for a dedicated tally light for each microphone, so that each guest in the studio will know when their individual microphone is live.
