= Professional video camera =

High-end camera for creating electronic moving images

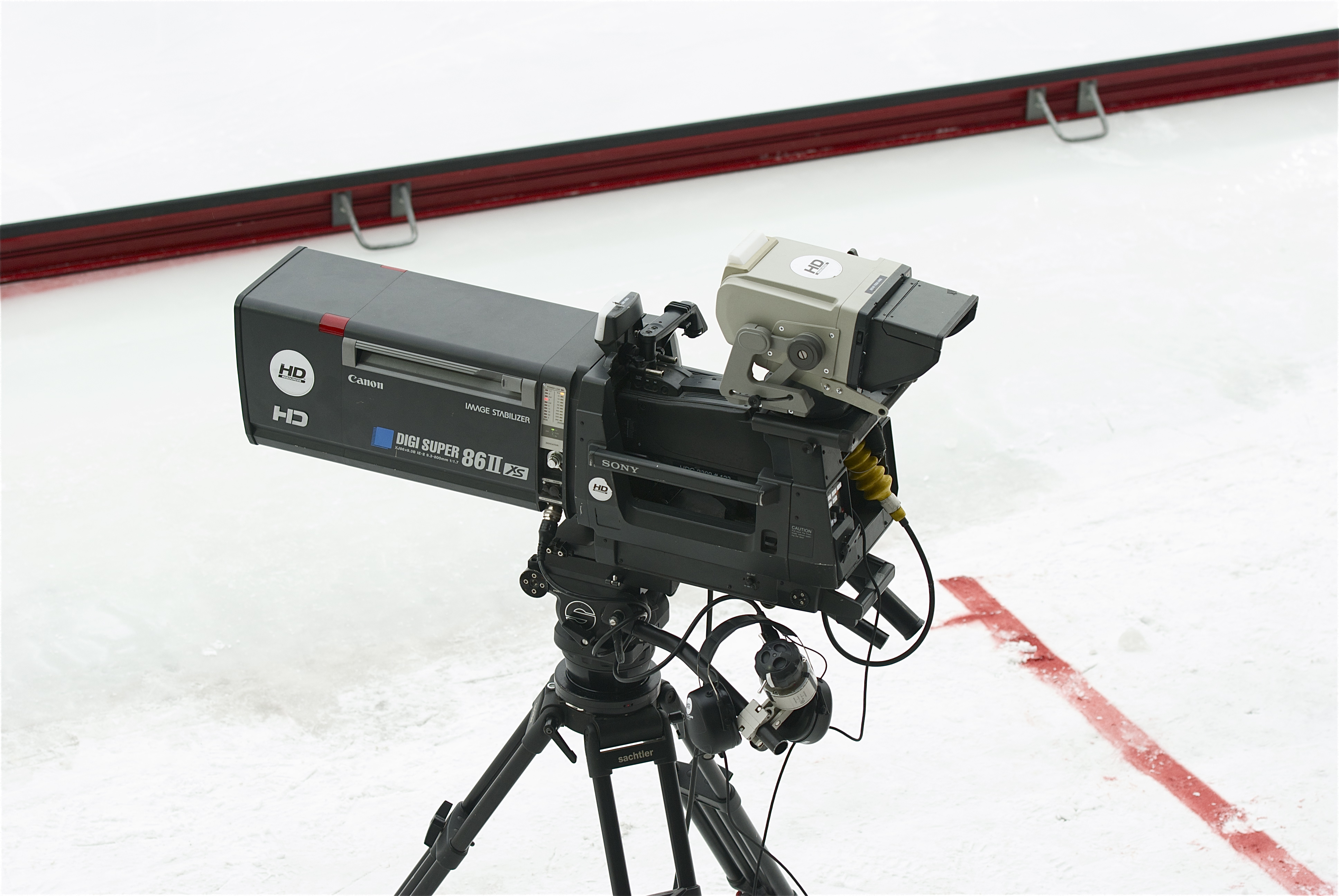
Modern digital television camera with a DIGI SUPER 86II xs lens from Canon

A professional video camera (often called a television camera even though its use has spread beyond television) is a high-end device for creating electronic moving images (as opposed to a movie camera, which uses film stock). Originally developed for use in television studios or with outside broadcast trucks, they are now also used for music videos, direct-to-video movies (see digital movie camera), corporate and educational videos, wedding videos, among other uses. Since the 2000s, most professional video cameras have been digital (instead of analog).

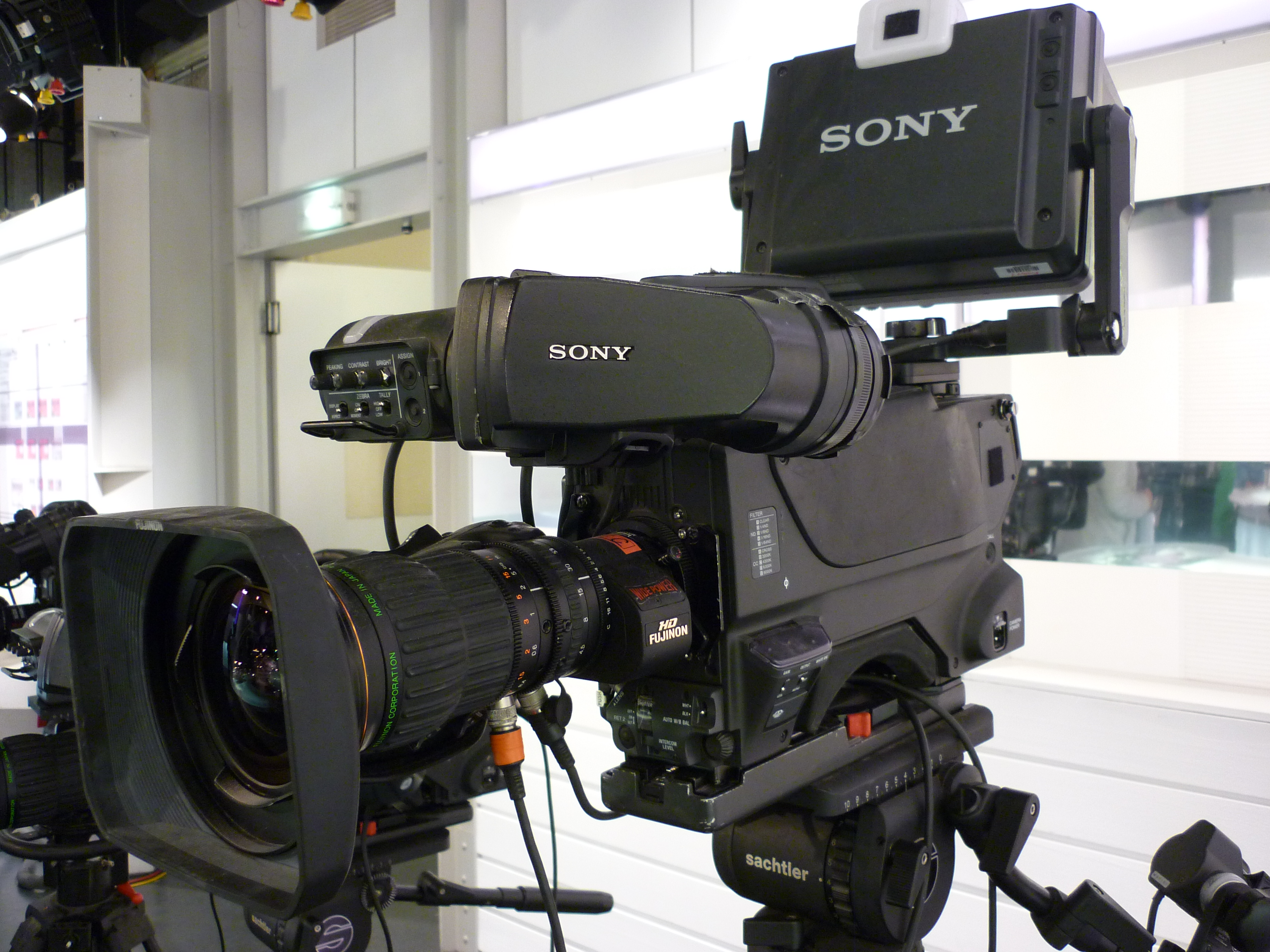
Sony HDC-1550 camera with Fujinon lens

The distinction between professional video cameras and movie cameras narrowed as HD digital video cameras with sensors the same size as 35mm movie cameras - plus dynamic range (exposure latitude) and color rendition approaching film quality - were introduced in the late 2010s. Nowadays, HDTV cameras designed for broadcast television, news, sports, events and other works such as reality TV are termed as professional video cameras. A digital movie camera is designed for movies or scripted television to record files that are then color corrected during post-production. The video signal from a professional video camera can be broadcast live, or is meant to be edited quickly with little or no color or exposure adjustments needed.

== History ==
The earliest video cameras were mechanical flying-spot scanners which were in use in the 1920s and 1930s during the period of mechanical television. Improvements in video camera tubes in the early 1930s ushered in the era of electronic television. Earlier, cameras were very large devices, almost always in two sections. The camera section held the lens and camera tube pre-amplifiers and other necessary electronics, and was connected to a large diameter multicore cable to the remainder of the camera electronics, usually mounted in a separate room in the studio, or a remote truck. The camera head could not generate a video picture signal on its own. The video signal was output to the studio for switching and transmission. By the fifties, electronic miniaturization had progressed to the point where some monochrome cameras could operate standalone and even be handheld. But the studio configuration remained, with the large cable bundle transmitting the signals back to the camera control unit (CCU). The CCU in turn was used to align and operate the camera's functions, such as exposure, system timing, video and black levels.

Broadcaster shown with a TV camera circa 1952

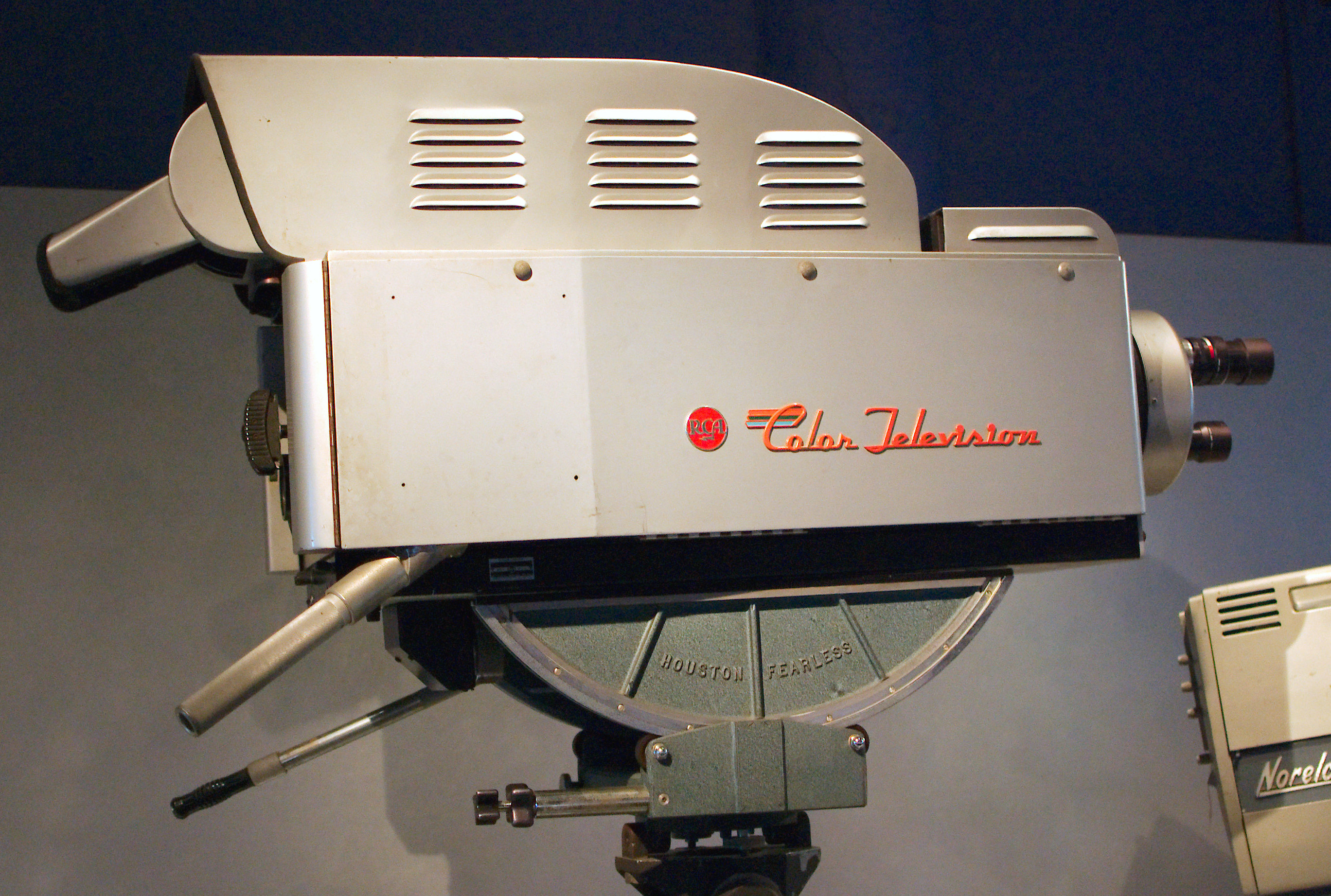
This 1954 RCA TK-41C, shown here mounted on a dolly, weighed 310 lbs.

The first color cameras (1950s in the US, early 1960s in Europe), notably the RCA TK-40/41 series, were much more complex with their three (and in some models four) pickup tubes, and their size and weight drastically increased. Handheld color cameras did not come into general use until the early 1970s - the first generation of cameras were split into a camera head unit (the body of the camera, containing the lens and pickup tubes, and held on the shoulder or a body brace in front of the operator) connected via a cable bundle to a backpack CCU.

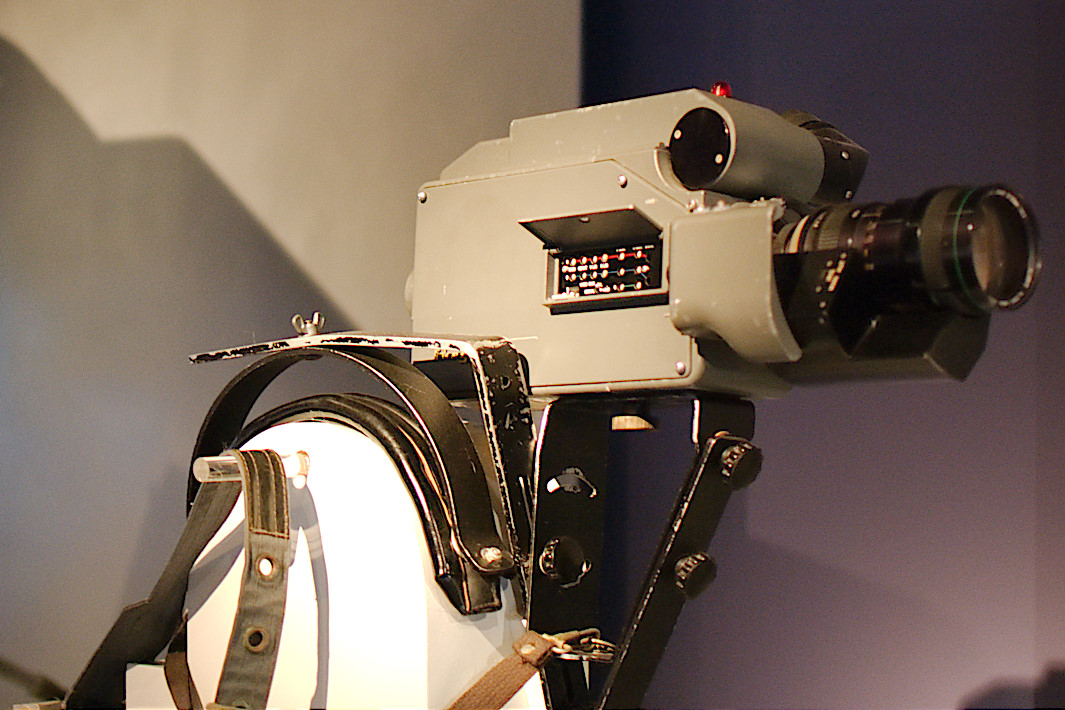
A 1973 Ikegami HL-33 ENG

The Ikegami HL-33, the RCA TKP45 and the Thomson Microcam were portable two piece color cameras introduced in the early 1970s. For field work a separate VTR was still required to record the camera's video output. Typically, this was either a portable 1" reel-to-reel VTR, or a portable 3/4" U-matic VCR. Typically, the two camera units would be carried by the camera operator, while a tape operator would carry the portable recorder. With the introduction of the RCA TK-76 in 1976, the Ikegami HL-77 in 1977, and the Sony BVP-300 in 1978, camera operators were finally able to carry on their shoulders a one-piece camera containing all the electronics to output a broadcast-quality composite video signal. A separate videotape recording unit was still required.

Electronic news-gathering (ENG) cameras replaced the 16mm film cameras for TV news production from the 1970s onwards because the cost of shooting on film was significantly more than shooting on reusable tape. Portable video tape production also enabled much faster turnaround time for the quick completion of news stories, compared to the need to chemically process film before it could be shown or edited. However, some news feature stories for weekly news magazine shows continued to use 16mm film cameras until the 1990s.

At first, all these cameras used tube-based sensors, but charge-coupled device (CCD) imagers came on the scene in the mid-80s, bringing numerous benefits. Early CCD cameras could not match the colour or resolution of their tube counterparts, but the benefits of CCD technology, such as introducing smaller and lightweight cameras, a better and more stable image (that was not prone to image burn in or lag) and no need for registration meant development on CCD imagers quickly took off and, once rivaling and offering a superior image to a tube sensor, began displacing tube-based cameras - the latter of which were all but disused by the early 1990s. Eventually, cameras with the recorder permanently mated to the camera head became the norm for ENG. In studio cameras, the camera electronics shrank, and CCD imagers replaced the pickup tubes. The thick multi-core cables connecting the camera head to the CCU were replaced in the late seventies with triax connections, a slender video cable that carried multiple video signals, intercom audio, and control circuits, and could be run for a mile or more. As the camera innards shrank, the electronics no longer dictated the size of the enclosure, however the box shape remained, as it is necessary to hold the large studio lenses, teleprompters, electronic viewfinder (EVF), and other paraphernalia needed for studio and sports production. Electronic Field Production cameras were often mounted in studio configurations inside a mounting cage. This cage supported the additional studio accessories.

In the late 1990s, as HDTV broadcasting commenced, HDTV cameras suitable for news and general-purpose work were introduced. Though they delivered much better image quality, their overall operation was identical to their standard definition predecessors. New methods of recording for cameras were introduced to supplant video tape, tapeless cameras. Ikegami and Avid introduced EditCam in 1996, based on interchangeable hard drives. Panasonic introduced P2 cameras. These recorded a DVCPro signal on interchangeable flash memory media. Several other data storage device recording systems were introduced, notably XDCAM from Sony. Sony also introduced SxS (S-by-S), a flash memory standard compliant to the Sony and Sandisk-created ExpressCard standard. Eventually, flash storage largely supplanted other forms of recording media.

In the 2000s, major manufacturers like Sony and Philips introduced digital professional video cameras. These cameras used CCD sensors and recorded video digitally on flash storage. These were followed by digital HDTV cameras. As digital technology improved and also due to digital television transition, digital professional video cameras have become dominant in television studios, ENG, EFP and even in other areas since the 2010s. CCD sensors were eventually replaced by CMOS sensors.

=== Chronology ===
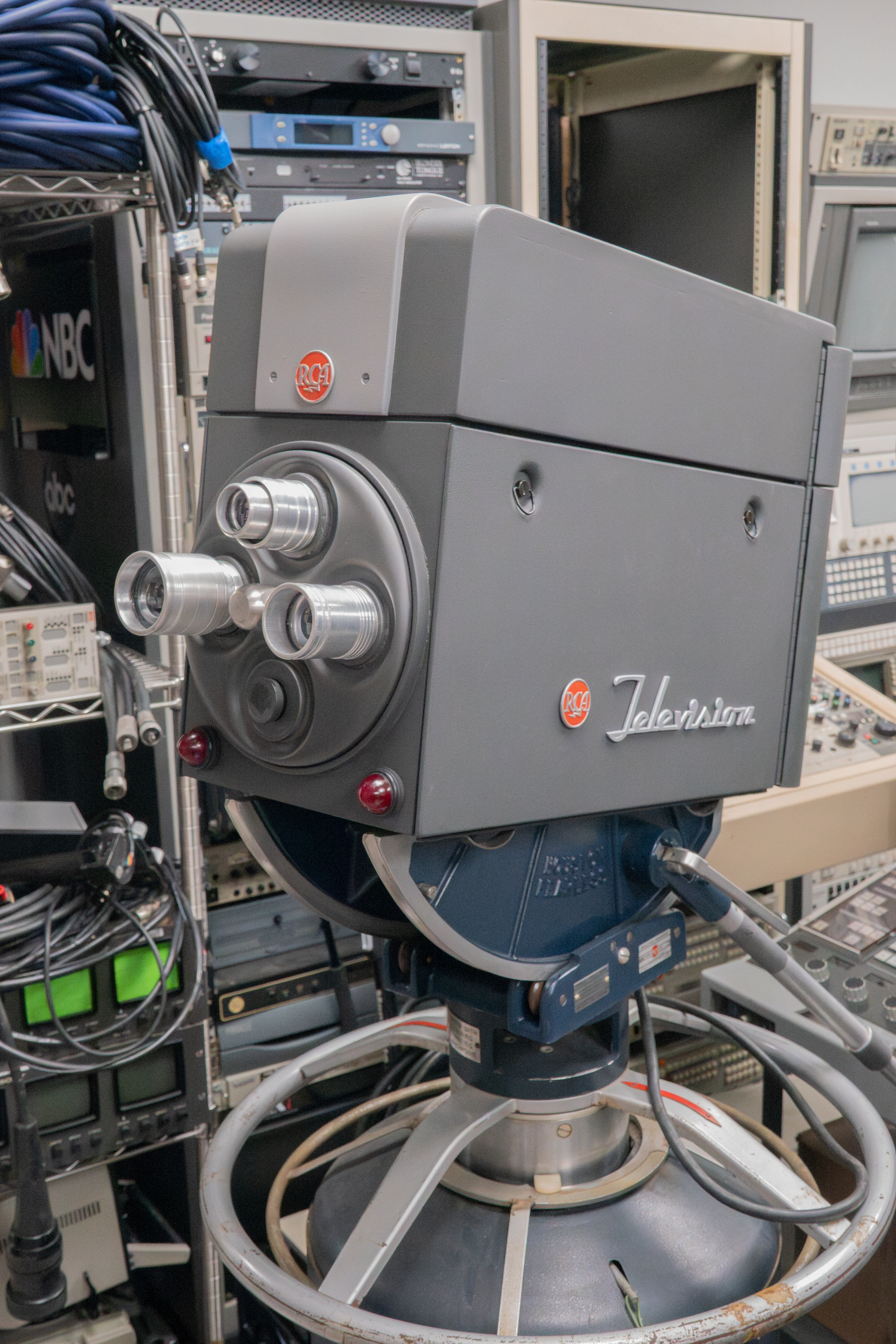
The RCA TK-10, a studio camera from 1946

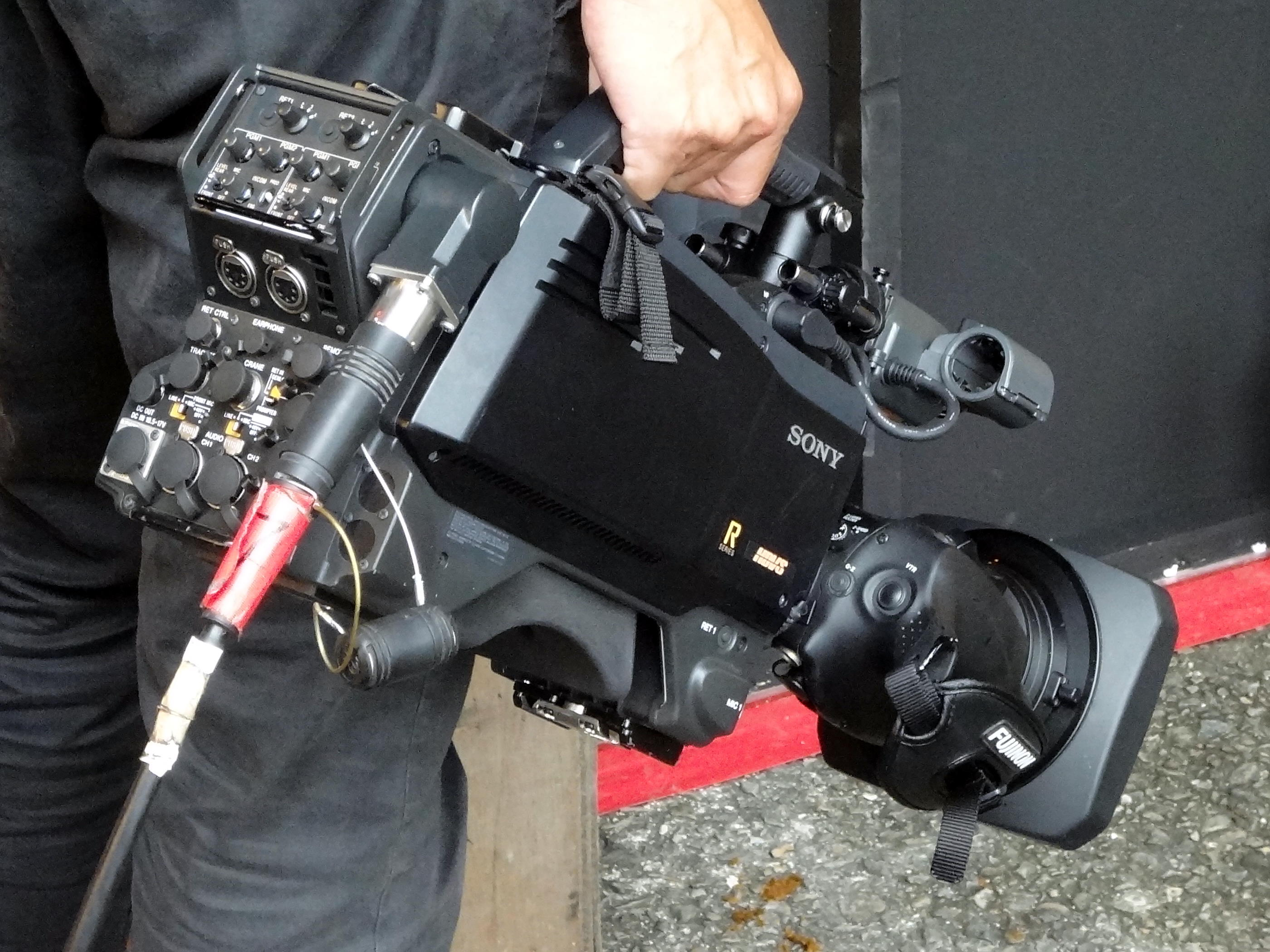
Sony HDC-series camera on an outside broadcast

- 1926 to 1933 "cameras" were a type of flying spot scanner using a mechanical disk.
- 1936 saw the arrival of RCA's iconoscope camera.
- 1946 RCA's TK-10 studio camera used a 3" IO – Image Orthicon tube with a 4 lens turret. The RCA TK-30 (1946) was widely used as a field camera. A TK-30 is simply a TK-10 with a portable camera control unit.
- The 1948 Dumont Marconi MK IV was an Image Orthicon camera. Marconi's first camera was shown in 1938. EMI cameras from the UK were used in the US in the early 1960s, like the EMI 203/4. Later in the 60s the EMI 2000 and EMI 2001.
- In 1950, the arrival of the Vidicon camera tube made smaller cameras possible. 1952 saw the first Walkie-Lookie "portable cameras". Image Orthicon tubes were still used till the arrival of the Plumbicon.
- The RCA TK-40 is considered to be the first color television camera for broadcasts in 1953. RCA continued its lead in the high-end camera market till the (1978) TK-47, last of the high-end tube cameras from RCA.
- 1954 RCA's TK-11 studio camera used a 3" IO – Image Orthicon tube with a four-lens turret. The RCA TK-31 (1954) was widely used as a field camera. A TK-31 is simply a TK-11 with a portable camera control unit. There is some commonality between the TK-11/TK-31 and the earlier TK-10/TK-30.
- Ikegami introduced the first truly portable hand-held TV camera in 1962.
- Philips' line of Norelco cameras were also very popular with models such as PC-60 (1965), PC-70 (1967) and PCP-90 (1968 Handheld). Major American broadcaster CBS was a notable early customer of the PC-60 and PC-70 units. Philips/BTS-Broadcast Television Systems Inc. later came out with an LDK line of cameras, like its last high-end tube camera, the LDK 6 (1982). Philips invented the Plumbicon pick up video camera tube in 1965, which gave tube cameras a cleaner picture. BTS introduced its first handHeld Frame transfer CCD- Charge-coupled device-CCD camera the LDK90, in 1987.
- Bosch Fernseh marketed a line of high-end cameras (KCU, KCN, KCP, KCK) in the US, ending with the tube camera KCK-40 (1978). Image Transform (in Universal City, California) used a specially modified 24-frame KCK-40 for their Image Vision system. This had a 10 MHz bandwidth, almost twice NTSC bandwidth. This was a custom pre HDTV video System. At its peak, this system was used to make "Monty Python Live at the Hollywood Bowl" in 1982. This was the first major high-definition analog wideband videotape-to-film post production using a film recorder for film out.
- In the 2000s, major manufacturers like Sony and Philips introduced the flash storage based digital television cameras. Since the 2010s, this storage system has become the most widely used.

== Usage types ==
Most professional cameras utilize an optical prism block directly behind the lens. This prism block (a trichroic assembly comprising two dichroic prisms) separates the image into the three primary colors, red, green, and blue, directing each color into a separate charge-coupled device (CCD) or Active pixel sensor (CMOS image sensor) mounted to the face of each prism. Some high-end consumer cameras also do this, producing a higher-resolution image, with better color fidelity than is normally possible with just a single video pickup.

In both single sensor Bayer filter and triple sensor designs, the weak signal created by the sensors is amplified before being encoded into analog signals for use by the viewfinder and also encoded into digital signals for transmission and recording. The analog outputs were normally in the form of either a composite video signal, which combined the color and luminance information to a single output, or an R-Y B-Y Y component video output through three separate connectors.

=== Studio cameras ===
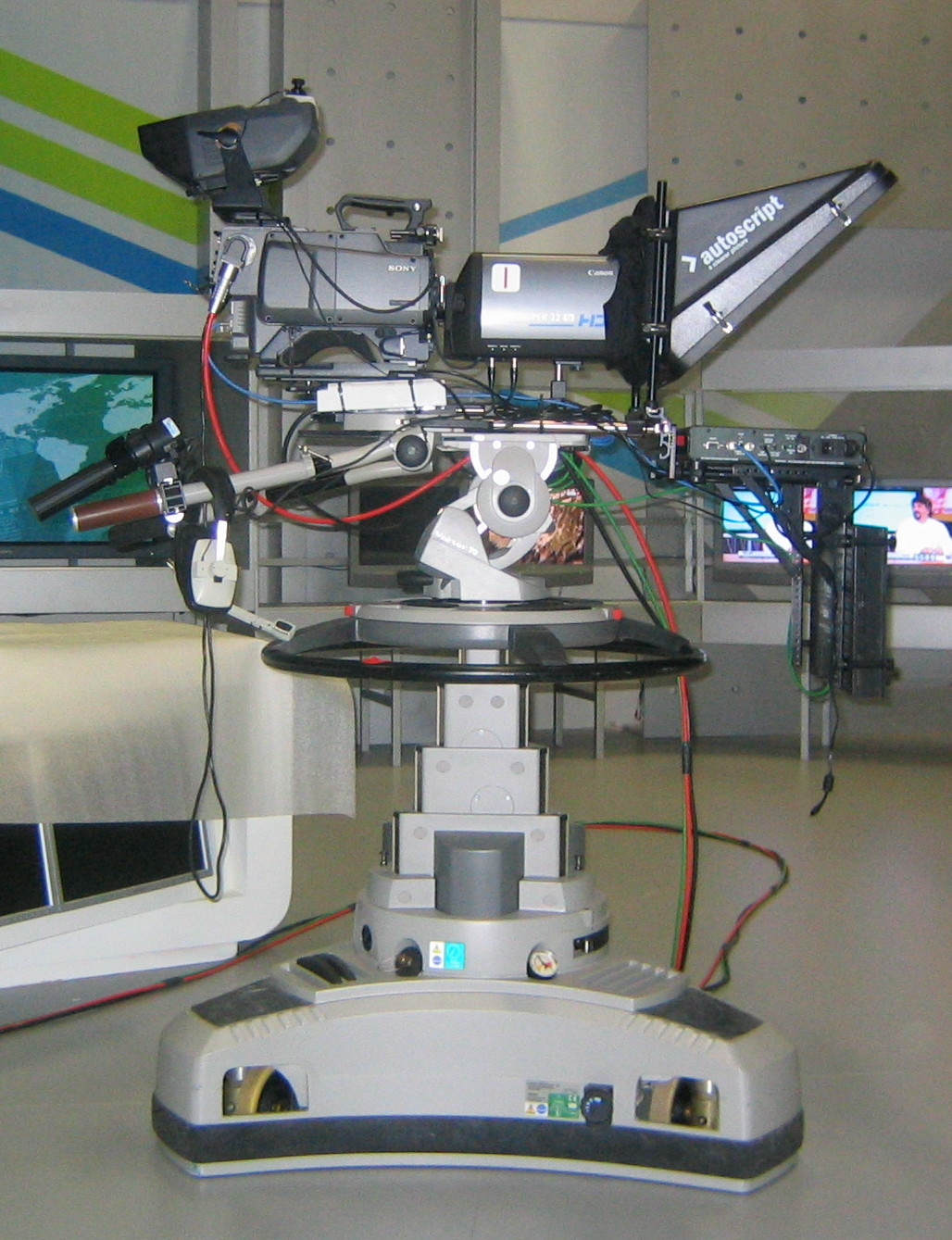
Studio camera, studio lens and teleprompter (from left to right) on a pedestal

Most television studio cameras stand on the floor, usually with pneumatic or hydraulic mechanisms called pedestals to adjust the height and position in the studio. The cameras in a multiple-camera setup are controlled by a device known as a camera control unit (CCU), to which they are connected via a triax, fibre optic or the almost obsolete multicore cable. The CCU, along with genlock and other equipment, is installed in the central apparatus room (CAR) of the television studio. A remote control panel in the production control room (PCR) for each camera is then used by the vision engineer(s) to balance the pictures.

When used outside a formal television studio in outside broadcasting (OB), they are often on tripods that may or may not have wheels (depending on the model of the tripod). Initial models used analog technology, but are now obsolete, supplanted by digital models.

Studio cameras are light and small enough to be taken off the pedestal and the lens changed to a smaller size to be used handheld on a camera operator's shoulder, but they still have no recorder of their own and are cable-bound. Cameras can also be mounted on a tripod, a dolly or a crane, thus making the cameras much more versatile than previous generations of studio cameras. These cameras have a tally light, a small signal lamp used that indicates, for the benefit of those being filmed as well as the camera operator, that the camera is 'live' – i.e. its signal is being used for the 'main program' at that moment.

=== ENG cameras ===
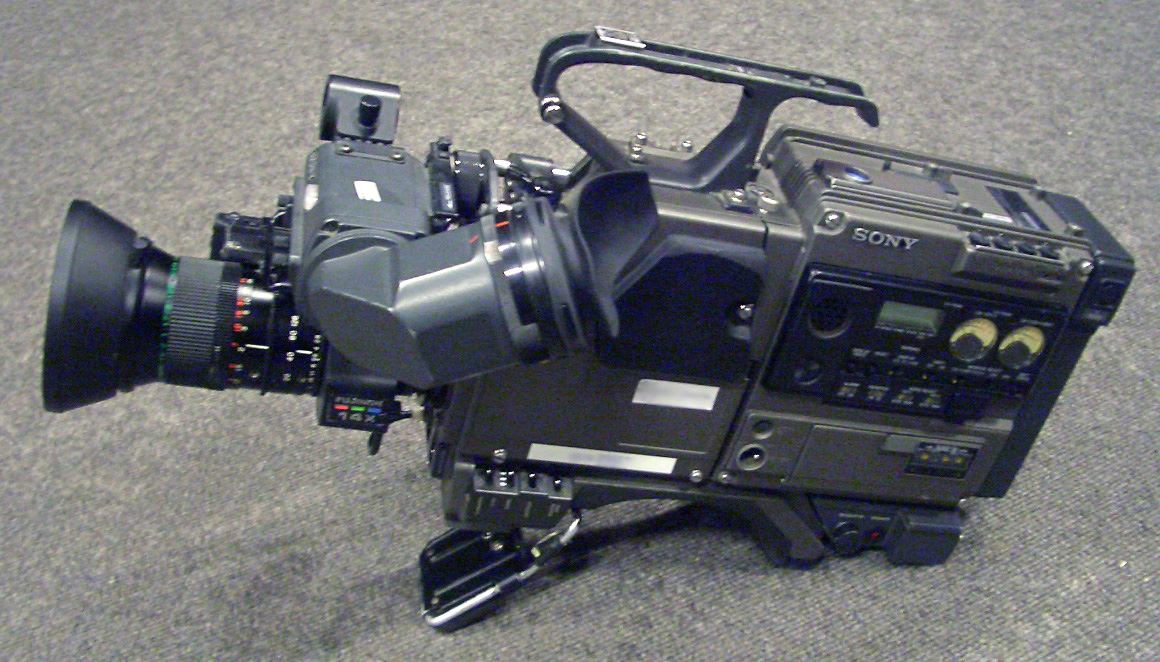
Sony camera head with Betacam SP dock recorder

ENG (electronic news gathering) video cameras were originally designed for use by news camera operators. While they have some similarities to the smaller consumer camcorder, they differ in several regards:

- ENG cameras are larger and heavier (helps dampen small movements), and usually supported by a camera shoulder support or shoulder stock on the camera operator's shoulder, taking the weight off the hand, which is freed to operate the zoom lens control.
- The camera mounts on tripods with Fluid heads and other supports with a quick release plate.
- 3 CCDs or CMOS active pixel sensors are used, one for each of the primary colors
- They have interchangeable lenses.
- The lens is focused manually and directly, without intermediate servo controls. However, the lens zoom and focus can be operated with remote controls with a television studio configuration operated by a camera control unit (CCU).
- A rotating behind-the-lens filter wheel, for selecting an 85A and neutral density filters.
- Controls that need quick access are on hard physical switches, all in the same general place on the camera, irrespective of the camera manufacturer, such as Gain Select, White/Black balance, color bar select, and record start controls and not in menu selection.
- All settings, white balance, focus, and iris can be manually adjusted, and automatics can be completely disabled.
- Professional BNC connectors for video out and genlock in.
- Can operate an electronic viewfinder (EVF) or external CRT viewfinder.
- At least two XLR input connectors for audio are included.
- Direct slot-in for portable wireless microphones.
- Audio is adjusted manually, with easily accessed physical knobs.
- A complete time code section is available, allowing time presets; multiple-camera setups can be time code-synchronized or jam synced to a master clock.
- "Bars and tone" are available in-camera (the SMPTE color bars (Society of Motion Picture and Television Engineers) Bars, a reference signal that simplifies calibration of monitors and setting levels when duplicating and transmitting the picture.)
- Recording is to a professional medium like some variant of Betacam or DVCPRO or Direct to disk recording or flash memory. If as in the latter two, it's a data recording, much higher data rates (or less video compression) are used than in consumer devices.

=== EFP cameras ===
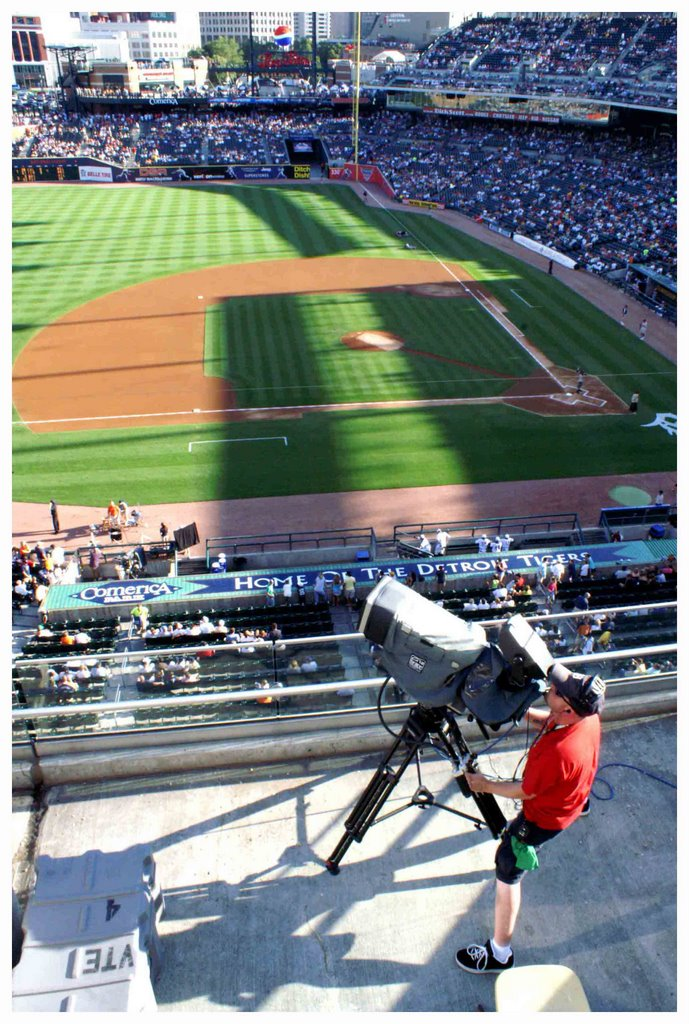
EFP camera operator at a baseball game

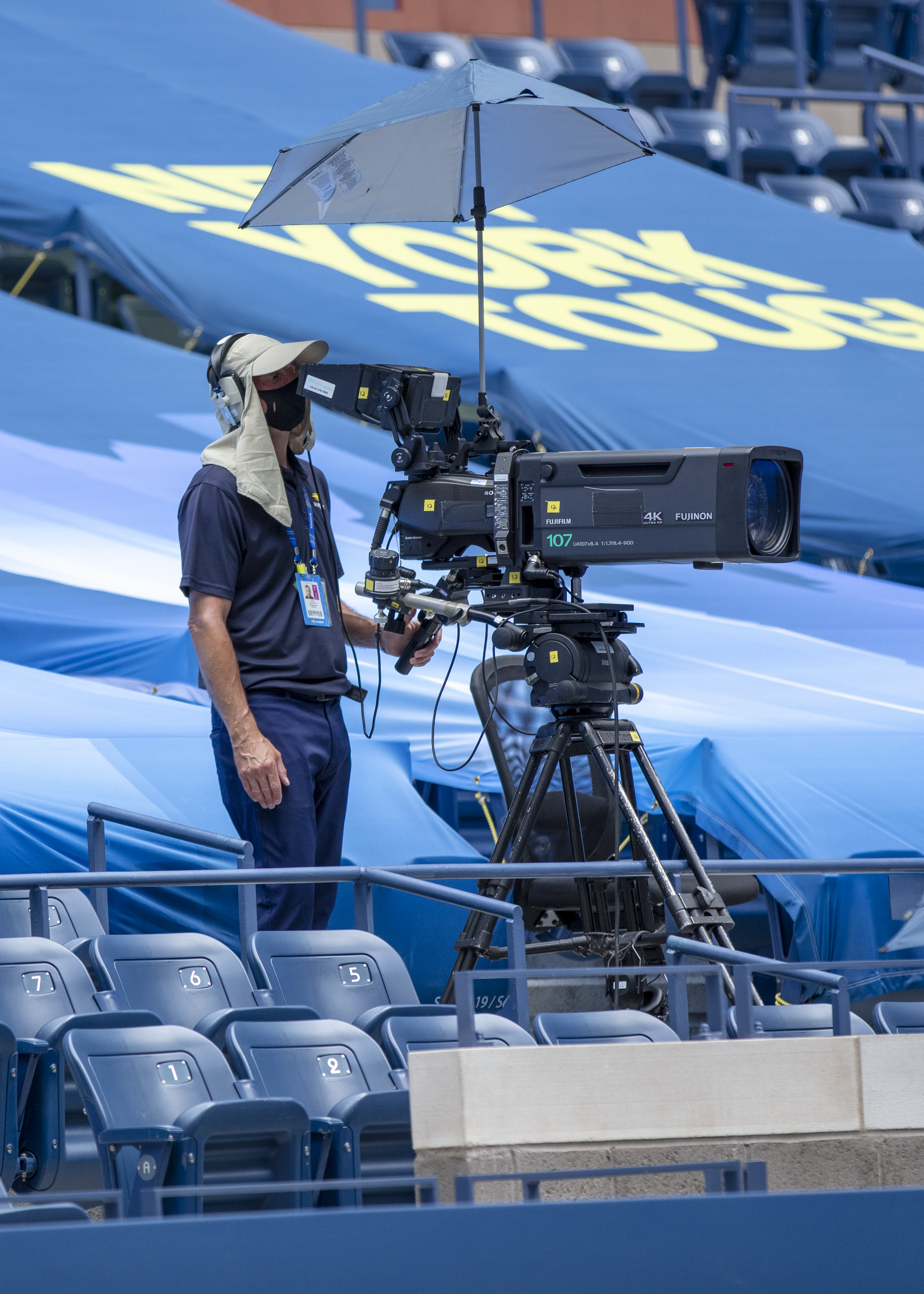
A camera operator at the 2020 U.S. Open in New York using a tripod-mounted hard camera equipped with a Fujinon UA107×8.4 4K box lens. An overhead umbrella and head-and-neck covering provide sun protection during extended outdoor broadcast operation. The UA107×8.4 lens offers a 107× zoom range, allowing broadcasters to capture tight player close-ups and fast-moving ball action from long distances; an essential requirement for tennis coverage.

Electronic field production cameras are similar to studio cameras in that they are used primarily in multiple camera switched configurations, but outside the studio environment, for concerts, sports and live news coverage of special events. These versatile cameras can be carried on the shoulder or mounted on camera pedestals and cranes, with the large, very long focal length zoom lenses made for studio camera mounting. These cameras have no recording ability on their own, and transmit their signals back to the broadcast truck through a fiber optic, triax, radio frequency or the virtually obsolete multicore cable.

=== Others ===
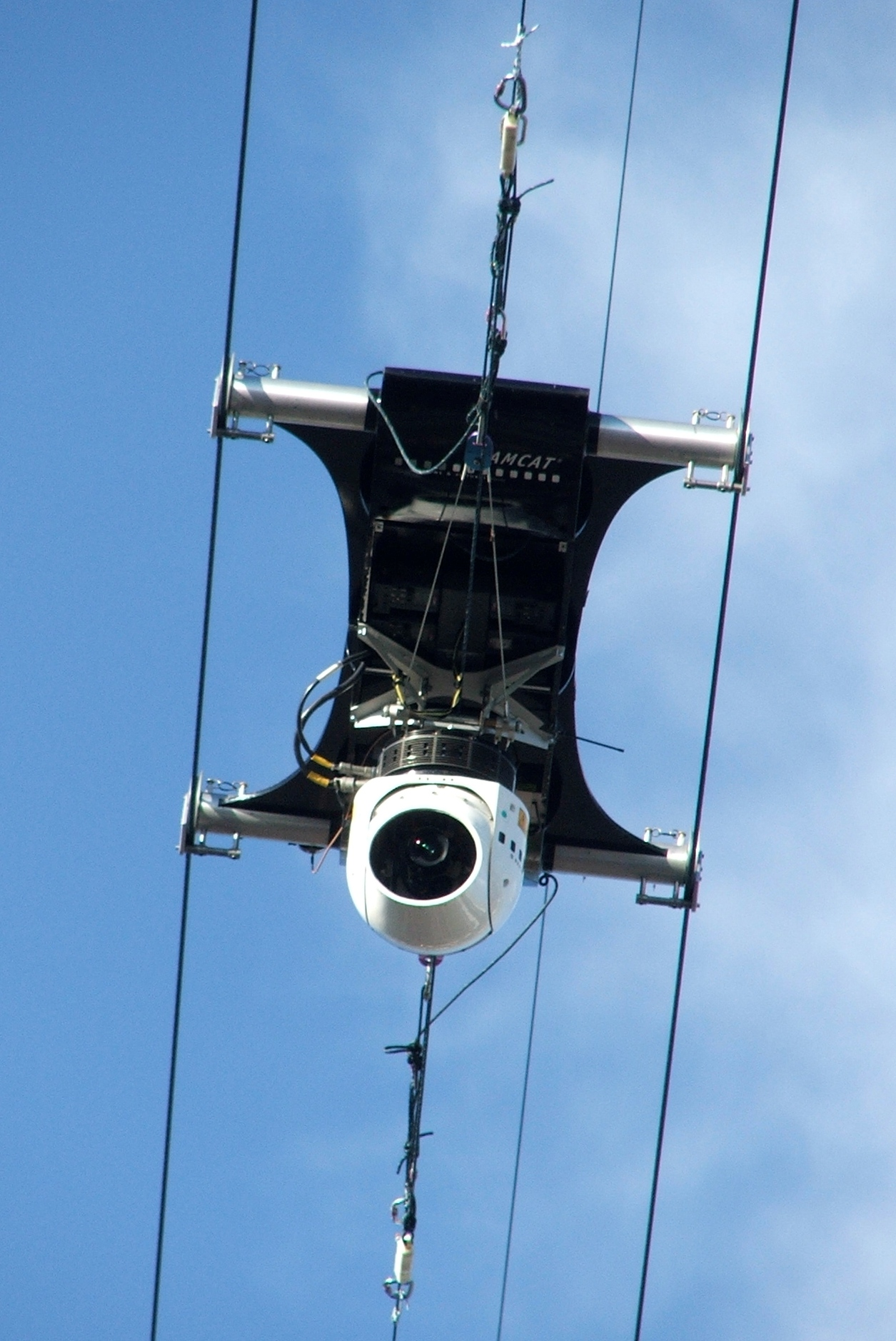
A remote-controlled camera mounted on a miniature cable car for mobility

Remote cameras are typically very small camera heads designed to be operated by remote control. Despite their small size, they are often capable of performance close to that of the larger ENG and EFP types.

Block cameras are so called because the camera head is a small block, often smaller than the lens itself. Some block cameras are completely self-contained, while others only contain the sensor block and its pre-amps, thus requiring connection to a separate camera control unit in order to operate. All the functions of the camera can be controlled from a distance, and often there is a facility for controlling the lens focus and zoom as well. These cameras are mounted on pan and tilt heads and may be placed in a stationary position, such as atop a pole or tower, in a corner of a broadcast booth, or behind a basketball hoop. They can also be placed on robotic dollies, at the end of camera booms and cranes, or "flown" in a cable-supported harness, as shown in the illustration.

Lipstick cameras are so called because the lens and sensor block combined are similar in size and appearance to a lipstick container. These are either hard mounted in a small location, such as a race car, or on the end of a boom pole. The sensor block and lens are separated from the rest of the camera electronics by a long, thin multi-conductor cable. The camera settings are manipulated from this box, while the lens settings are normally set when the camera is mounted in place.

== See also ==
- Akai
- Ampex
- John Logie Baird
- Broadcast Television Systems Inc. LDK Norelco- line of cameras
- Digital cinematography
- Digital cinematography cameras
- Allen B. DuMont
- Link Electronics Ltd
- Fernseh KC- line of cameras
- Film chain
- Grass Valley (company) LDK - line of cameras
- Hitachi SK- line of cameras
- Ikegami HL and HK -line of cameras
- Marconi Company EMI - line of cameras
- Multiple-camera setup
- Norelco PC line of cameras
- PAL
- Philips KD - line of cameras
- RCA TK- line of cameras
