= Broadcast Television Systems Inc. =

Video equipment company

Broadcast Television Systems (BTS) was a joint venture between Robert Bosch GmbH's Fernseh Division and Philips Broadcast in Breda, Netherlands, formed in 1986.

== History ==
Philips had been in the broadcast market for many years with a line of PC- and LDK- Norelco professional video cameras and other video products. By the 1980s, the Norelco name was dropped in favour of Philips. Robert Bosch GmbH's Fernseh Division also had a long history going back to the early days of television (1929).

BTS's North America headquarters was at first located in Salt Lake City, Utah. This was later moved to Simi Valley, California, in 1991, later returning to Salt Lake City. Also in 1991, BTS Latin America entered into an agreement to provide Televisa SA of Mexico what was believed to be until that time, the largest equipment sale in history.

In 1995 Philips Electronics North America Corp. fully acquired BTS Inc., renaming it Philips Broadcast-Philips Digital Video Systems. The BTS Inc.'s Darmstadt factory in Germany was near the Darmstadt Train Station and European Space Operations Centre this was later moved a short distance to Weiterstadt, Germany.

In March 2001, Philips' broadcast video division was sold to Thomson SA, the current owner; the division was called Thomson Multimedia. In 2002, the French electronics giant Thomson SA also acquired the Grass Valley Group from Terry Gooding of San Diego, CA, USA. Grass Valley, Inc., the Thomson, Grass Valley, a Thomson Brand is headquartered in Nevada City, California.

The Thomson Film Division, located in Weiterstadt, including the product line of Spirit DataCine, Bones Work station and LUTher 3D Color Space converter, was sold to Parter Capital Group. The sale was made public on Sept. 9, 2008 and completed on Dec. 1, 2008. The new headquarters is in Weiterstadt, in the former Bosch Fernseh - BTS factory. Parter Capital Group will continue to have worldwide offices to support products from Weiterstadt, Germany. The new name of the company is Digital Film Technology. On October 1, 2012, Precision Mechatronics and DFT were acquired by Prasad Corp, part of Prasad Studios. In 2013 DFT moved from Weiterstadt to Arheilgen-Darmstadt, Germany. In 2025 DFT parted from Prasad Corp, to be an independent company.

Grass Valley operated offices in the cities of all the former acquisitions:

- Cergy, France (Thomson World Headquarters)
- Salt Lake City, Utah, USA – from TeleMation Inc. – Bell and Howell – BTS
- Beaverton, Oregon, USA – from Tektronix
- Nevada City, California, USA – from Grass Valley Group
- Breda, Netherlands – from Philips – Norelco – BTS

After the 2008 financial crisis, Thomson became upside-down in its financial covenants and was forced by its creditors to divest itself of Grass Valley and other manufacturing entities. On January 29, 2009, Thomson announced that they were putting the Grass Valley division up for sale.

In 2010, the Grass Valley business unit, not including the head-end and transmission businesses, was acquired by private equity firm Francisco Partners and resumed operating as an independent company on January 1, 2011. Grass Valley still maintains offices worldwide.

Grass Valley was sold to Belden on February 6, 2014, Belden also owns Miranda.

== Products ==
See:

- Fernseh - for German-made products
- TeleMation Inc. for SLC products.

Philips invented the plumbicon pick up video camera tube in 1965; almost all of their color cameras used this award-winning tube. Starting with the LDK 90 camera, Philips used their Frame transfer CCD - Charge-coupled device. Philips' patented Dynamic Pixel Management (DPM) FT-17 CCD technology won awards and was first used in the 1994 LDK10 and LDK10p camera.

Philips-BTS product from Breda, Netherlands, professional video camera products:

- EL-8020 B&W Studio 5 fixed lens
- LDK2 1970s Norelco
- LDH10 Norelco
- LDH20 Norelco
- LDH-0200 Studio Norelco
- LDK3 Studio PC-80 Norelco
- LDK4800 ? Triax repeater ? Camera ?
- LDK5 1971 Studio 3 tubes Philips
- LDK6 1982 Studio 3 tubes Norelco/BTS
- LDK9P BTS CCD 1993 HandHeld
- LDK10 BTS DPM CCD 1994
- LDK10P BTS DPM CCD 1994
- LDK11 1976 ENG Backpack Norelco
- LDK12 ENG
- LDK13 1971 ENG Backpack Norelco
- LDK14 1977 ENG 3 tubes Philips
- LDK15 1974? ENG Norelco
- LDK20 ~1997 BTS CCD
- LDK23HS BTS CCD Super slow mo
- LDK25 Studio
- LDK26 1982 Studio
- LDK33 Early Handheld
- LDK44 1984 Studio/ENG 3 tubes
- LDK54 Handheld 3 tubes
- LDK63
- LDK65
- LDK90 1987 BTS CCD HandHeld
- LDK91 BTS CCD HandHeld
- LDK93 BTS CCD HandHeld
- LDK491 ENG Philips DIODE GUN PLUMBICONS
- LDK614 LDK6 handheld
- LDK700 BTS CCD
- LDK910 BTS CCD Studio
- LDK9000 BTS CCD HDTV
- LDM42 B&W 1968 Studio
- LDM53 B&W Studio
- PC60 1965 Studio 3 tubes Norelco
- PC70 1967 Studio 3 tubes Norelco
- PC80 Studio Norelco LDK3
- PC100 Studio Norelco
- PCP70 Handheld Norelco
- PCP90 1968 Handheld Norelco
- VIDEO 80 Handheld

Current:

- LDK 300 CCD Thomson Grassvalley
- LDK 400 CCD Thomson Grassvalley
- LDK 500 CCD Thomson Grassvalley 2003
- LDK23HS Mk2 CCD Super slow mo Thomson Grassvalley
- LDK 5000 CCD Thomson Grassvalley
- TTV 1657D CCD Thomson Grassvalley
- LDK 20S CCD Thomson Grassvalley
- LDK 1707 CCD Thomson Grassvalley
- LDK 4000 CCD HDTV Thomson Grassvalley
- LDK 5000 CCD HDTV Thomson Grassvalley
- LDK 6000 CCD HDTV Thomson Grassvalley
- LDK 6200 CCD HDTV Super SloMo
- LDK 8000 CCD HDTV/SDTV

Philips early VTRs:

- LDL110 Portable
- NL1500 cassette
- LDL110 Portable 1977
- NL1702
- VR202
- VR2350

== Awards ==
- Outstanding Achievement in Technical/Engineering Development Awards from National Academy of Television Arts & Sciences.
  - 1966-1967 PLUMBICON TUBE - N.V. Philips -Breda
  - 1987-1988 FGS 4000 computer animation system CGI- BTS -SLC, UT
  - 1991-1992 Triaxial cable Technology for Color Television Cameras -N.V. Philips -Breda
  - 1992-1993 Prism Technology for Color Television Cameras -N.V. Philips -Breda
  - 1993-1994 Controlled Edge Enhancement Utilizing Skin Hue KeyingBTS and Ikegami (Joint Award) -Breda
  - 1997-1998 Development of a High Resolution Digital Film Scanner Eastman Kodak and Philips Germany. See Spirit DataCine
  - 2000-2001 Pioneering developments in shared video-data storage systems for use in television video servers - BTS/Philips/Thomson/ - SLC, UT
  - 2002-2003 Technology to simultaneously encode multiple video qualities and the corresponding metadata to enable real-time conformance and / or playout of the higher quality video (nominally broadcast) based on the decisions made using the lower quality proxies Montage. Philips and Thomson.

== Photo gallery ==
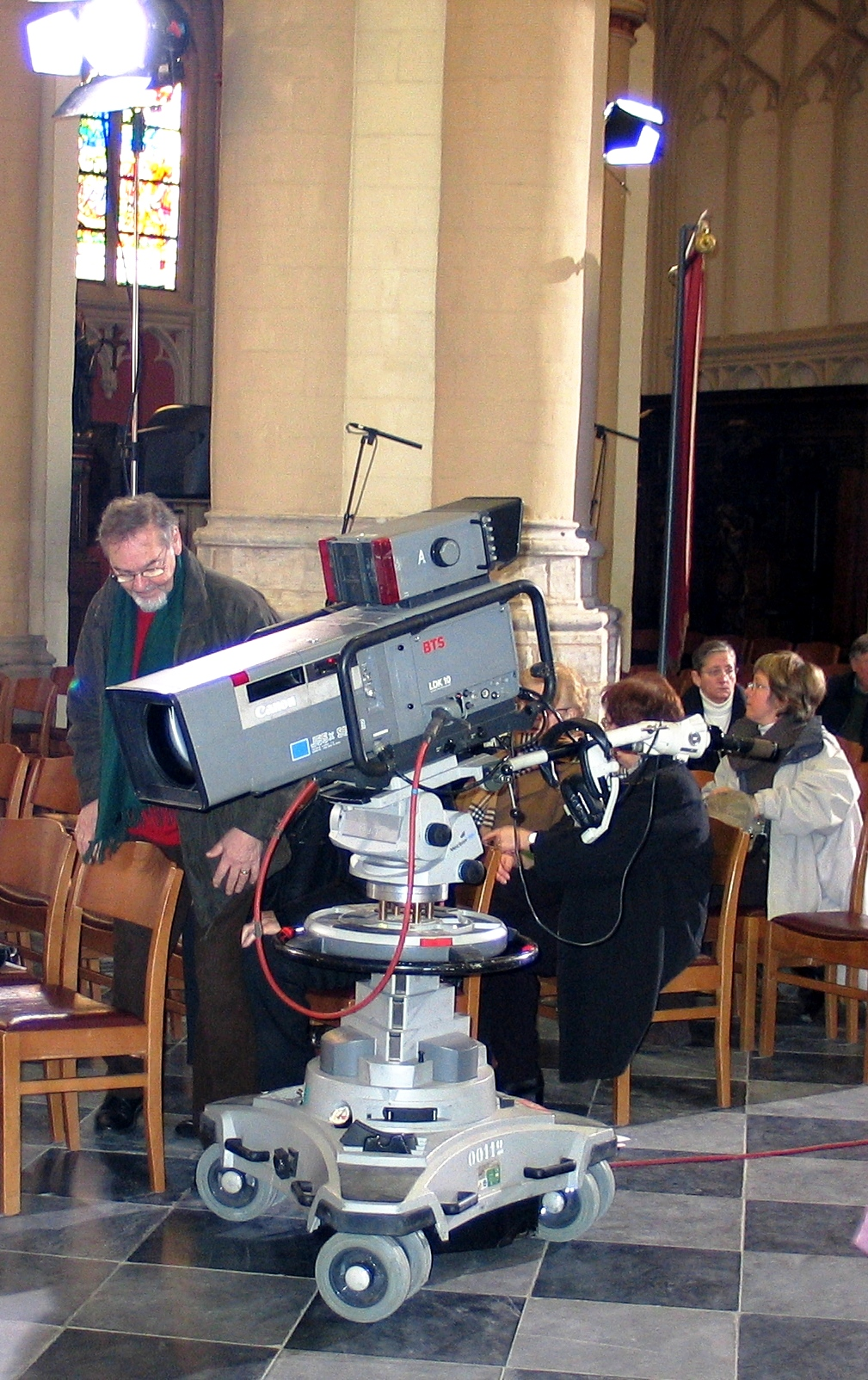
BTS -Philips LDK 10

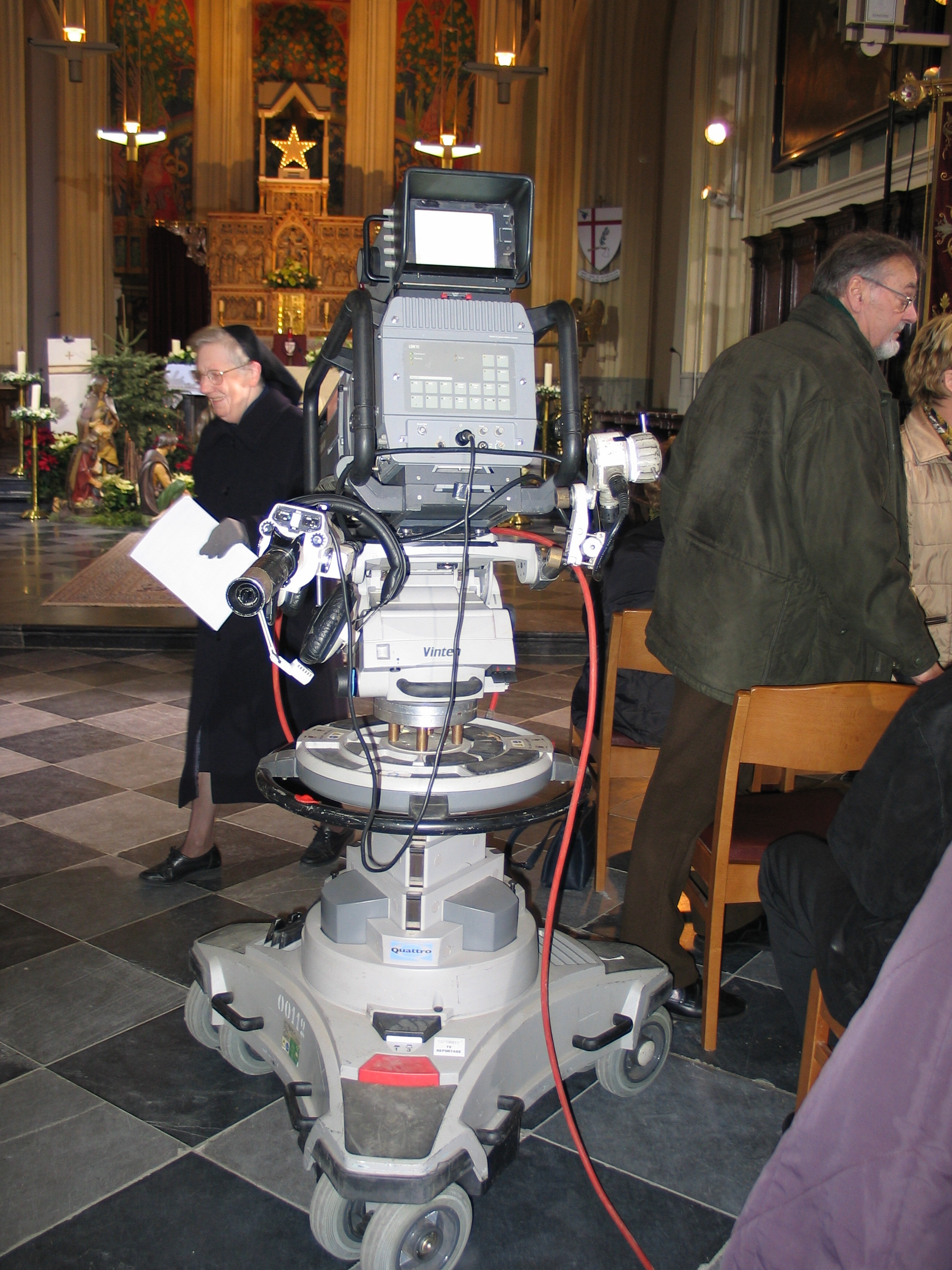
BTS -Philips LDK 10 from rear

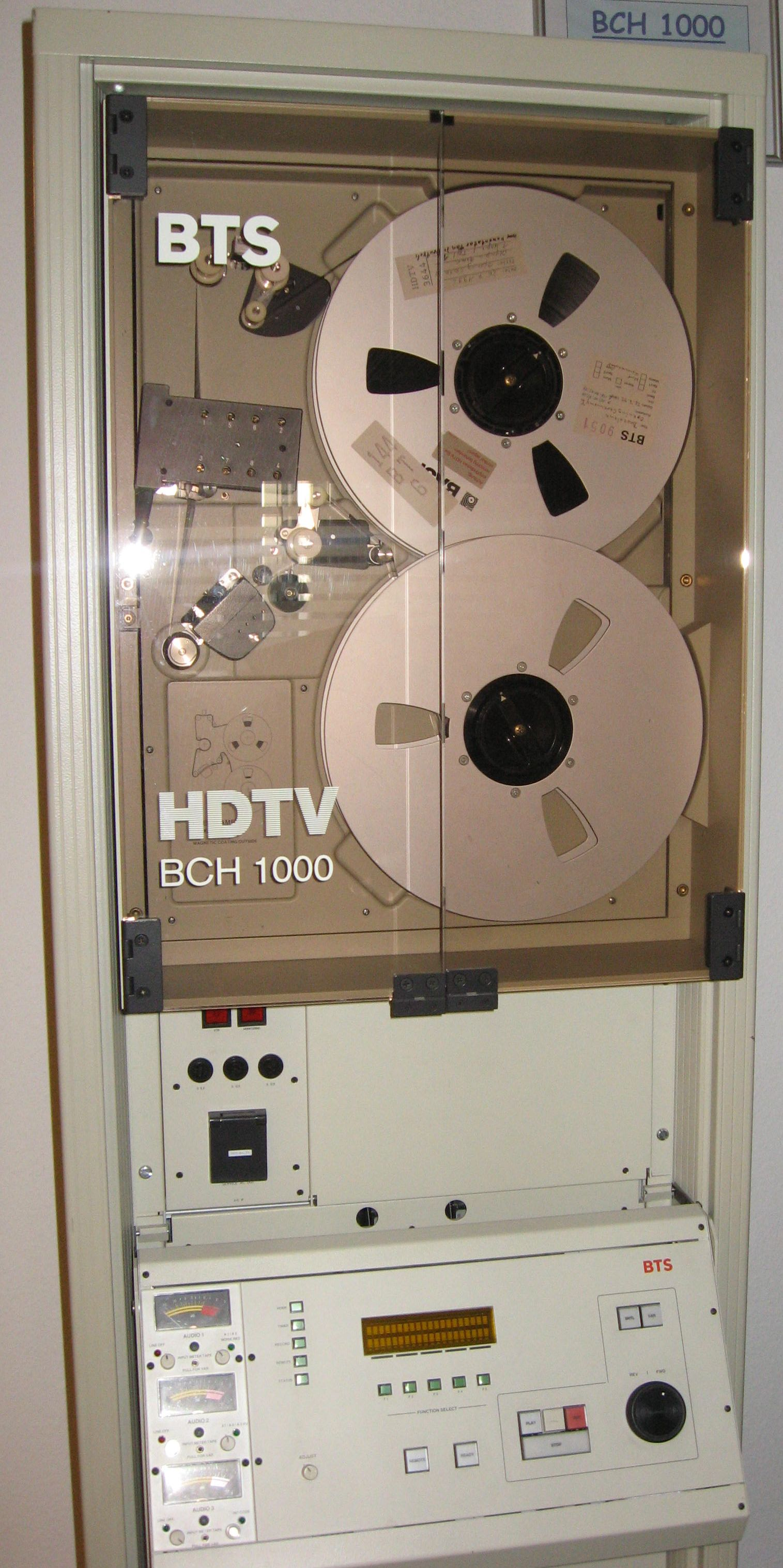
BCH-1000 HDTV Type B VTR

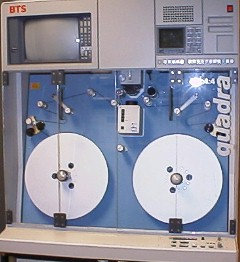
Quadra Telecine Film Deck

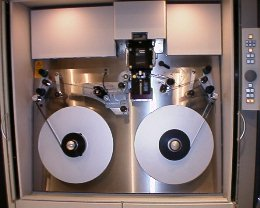
Early SDC-2000 Spirit DataCine was made by BTS

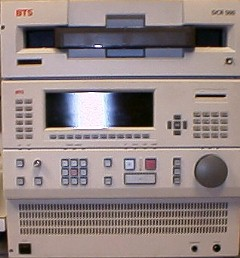
BTS D1 VTR DCR500

== See also ==
- Fernseh
- TeleMation Inc.
- Philips
- Robert Bosch GmbH
- Norelco
- Grass Valley (company)
- Thomson SA
- Professional video camera
