= Camera control unit =

Equipment for powering, controlling and handling signals of a video camera

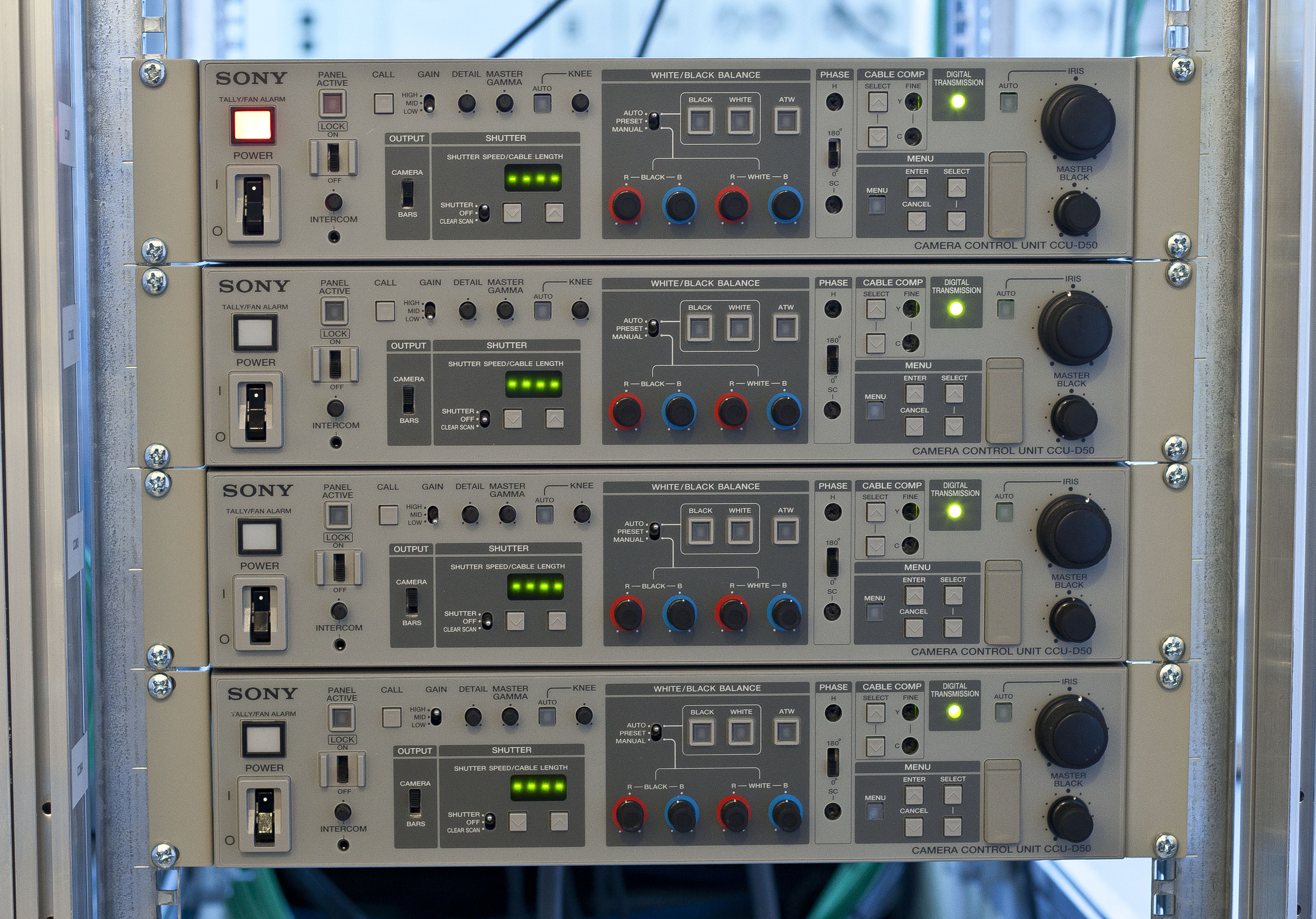
Four Sony CCU-D50 control units

The camera control unit (CCU) is typically part of a live television broadcast chain. It is responsible for powering the professional video camera, handling signals sent over the camera cable to and from the camera, and can be used to control various camera parameters remotely.

== History ==
Before cameras became self-contained units, broadcast cameras required vast racks of control units just to generate a usable picture. In outside broadcast production, these racks took up an entire section of the OB truck and were operated by a small team of skilled engineers. These vision engineers had two roles. Firstly, they set up the CCUs at the start of a production and ensured that the picture created was of broadcast quality. This process included a lengthy alignment process in which the vision engineer would work with the camera operator to adjust the settings on both the actual camera and the CCU in tandem. During production, it was the vision engineers' job to operate the CCUs and control both the exposure and the colour balance. So skilled and labour-intensive was this role that each CCU required its own dedicated vision engineer.

== Benefits ==
Modern cameras are typically more self-contained than their predecessors and many can operate without a CCU. Even when not required, a CCU can be of benefit for the following reasons:

- In a system with a multiple-camera setup, the cameras can be matched – made to look the same in terms of colour balance and picture intensity without having to ask camera operators to make an adjustment.
- The camera operators are freed from the control of iris, black level and colour balance, leaving them free to concentrate on other aspects of camerawork such as blocking and image composition.
- All signals that operate between the camera and CCU are carried in one multicore cable, triax or fiber optic cable.

== Functions ==
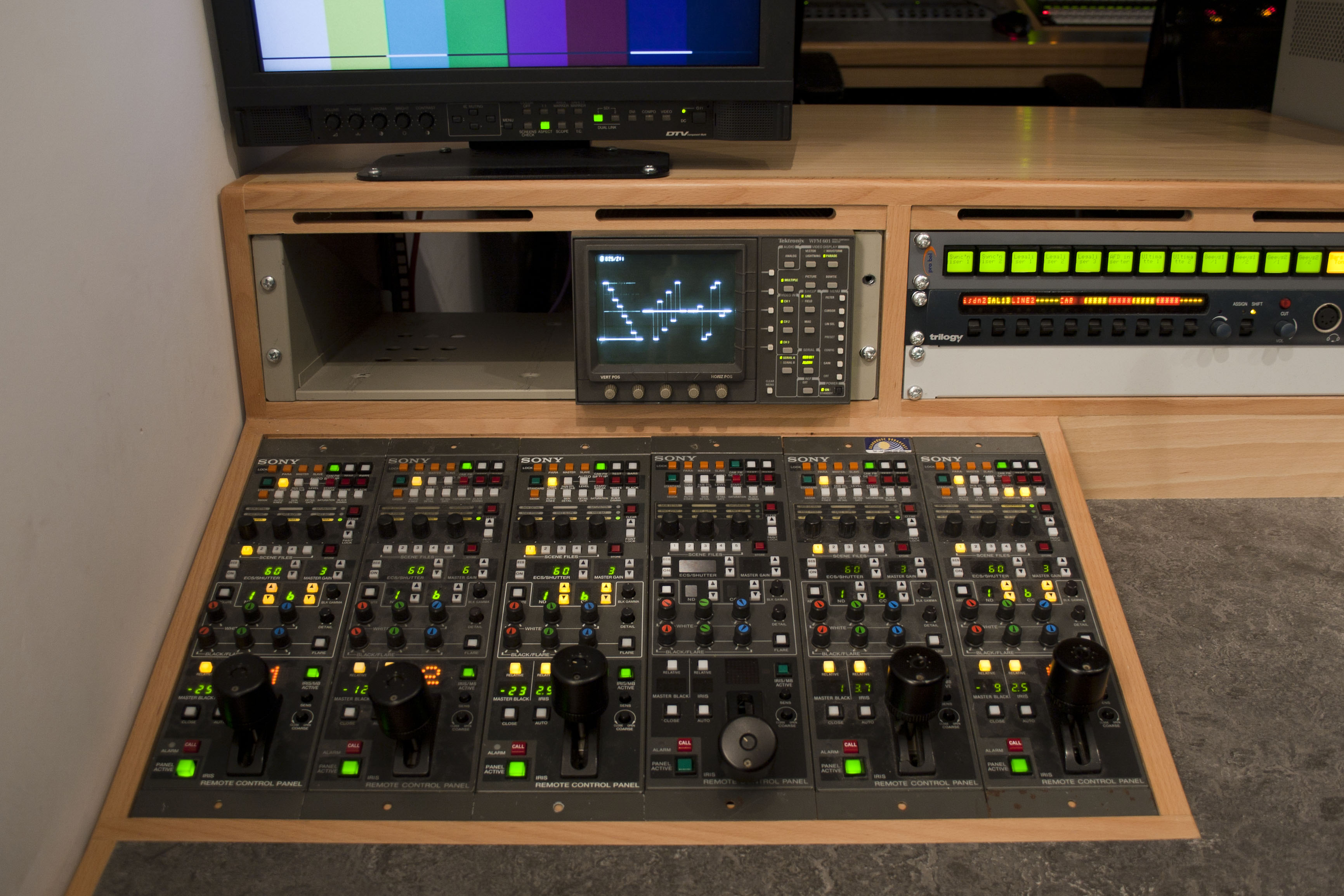
A bank of RCPs for racking Sony studio cameras.

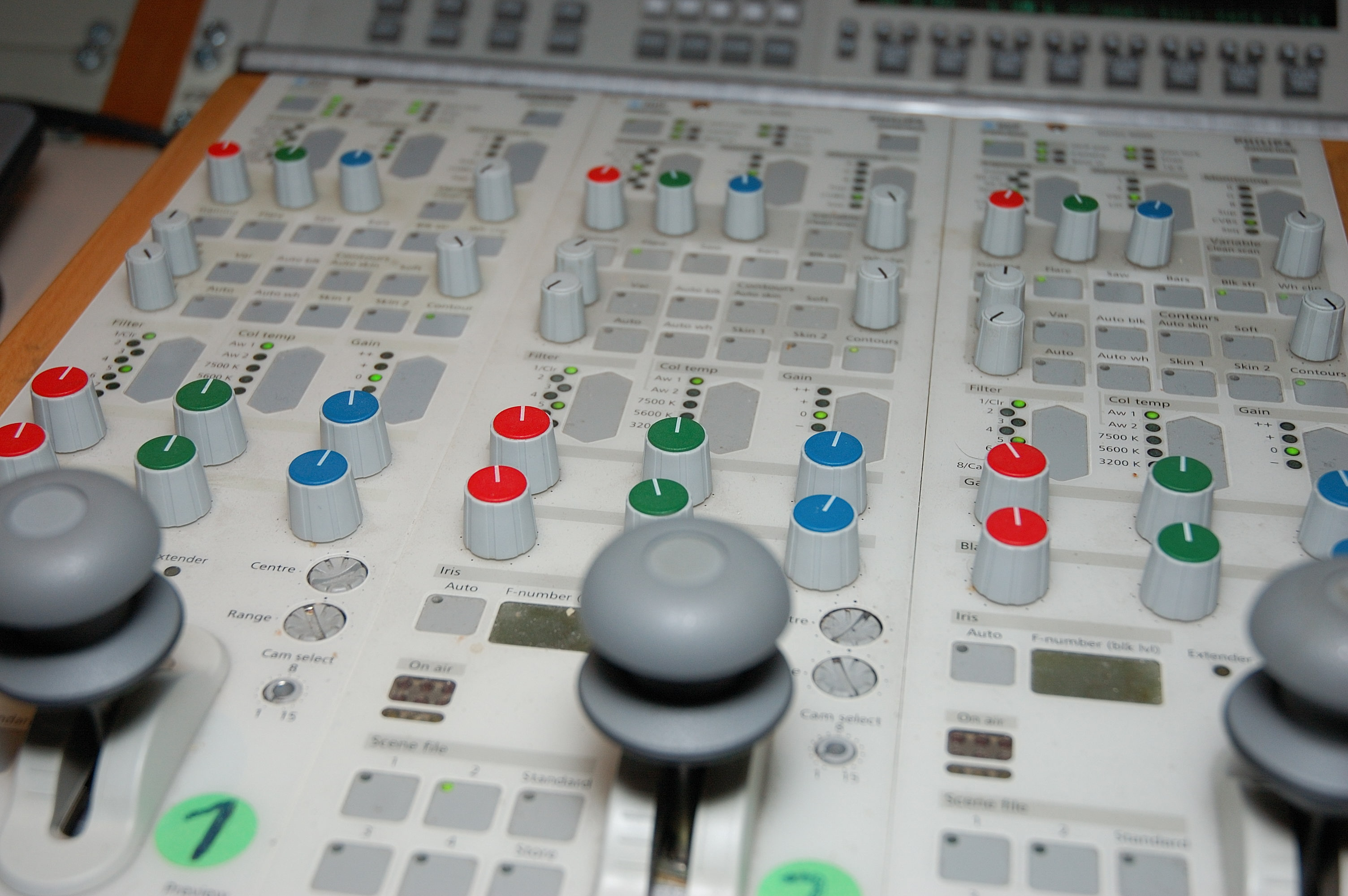
Detail of three Philips RCP panels.

A CCU is often used in conjunction with a remote-control panel (RCP), a waveform monitor and a vectorscope to rack and match many cameras together remotely.

Common adjustable parameters include:

- Iris (see aperture)
- Color temperature filters
- Neutral density filters
- Shutter speed
- Saturation
- Master gain
- Master black (pedestal)
- Black level trim (for red, green and blue components)
- Gain trim (for red, green and blue components)

In addition to these, there are usually options internally generating a test card for testing, return feeds or talkback. For more complex productions, preset scene files can be recalled to quickly change the settings of the camera on the fly.

== Connectivity ==
Broadcast cameras typically carry several signals over the camera cable in addition to the camera output itself.

Typically, RGB signals are transmitted over the camera cable. The CCU will usually convert these to SDI, YUV or composite for interfacing to other video equipment – typically it will be connected to a vision mixer via a video router.

Typical signals can be both digital signal and analog signals:

- Video out (Serial digital interface (SDI))
- Video out (composite video)
- Video out (component video)
- Audio out (microphone on board)
- Video in (genlock in the form of color burst)
- Return video in (composite) – typically for a teleprompter
- Return video in – carrying the output from the vision mixer
- Interruptible feedback Intercom
- Tally light trigger

== See also ==
- Television studio
