= Black balance =

Video cameras can possess a function called black balance which calibrates the signal for no light, just as they have a "white balance" function which gives reference to true white to the CCDs. Unlike white balance, black balance is not adjusted every time. This function is found in higher end 'professional' cameras rather than in cameras for amateurs.

== Purpose ==
The main purpose of black balance is to eliminate any residual current being output from the pixel sites under conditions of complete darkness, often referred to as thermal noise. This is why the camera automatically closes the iris completely when it does the black balance.

Conditions under which black balance are typically done are when the camera experiences a large change in operating temperature, especially from colder to warmer. Otherwise, it is a periodic thing to allow for other minor factors that could come into play.

With CMOS sensor technology, black balancing may not be as necessary as it is with CCD type devices. It is common to talk about how clean and relatively noise free CMOS sensors are by design.

== Availability ==
Black balancing is done only in professional cameras. Amateur handycam users need not worry about black balance. Professional camcorders like the Sony DSR 400, Panasonic DVC Pro etc. have a switch which has to be flicked upwards to do the white balance. The same switch when pressed downwards does a black balance. In the Panasonic 102 3ccd series, the white balance switch when pressed just once triggers white balancing and when depressed and held for a few seconds completes the black balance. Most camera operators never touch the black balance. Black balance can be done if the colours do not seem to be truly represented even after doing the white balance.

== Frequency of black balance adjustment ==
There is a lot of debate on whether it is necessary to do the black balance every time.

Panasonic 102 XB camera operating instructions manual suggests that black balance be performed when:

- The camera is used for the first time
- The camera is first used after a long period of disuse
- The ambient temperature changes greatly
- When switching to normal shutter or slow shutter
- When switching between progressive and interlaced modes
