= Philips Norelco =

American brand name

Philips Norelco is the American brand name for electric shavers and other personal care products made by the Personal Care division of Philips.

For personal care products marketed outside the United States, Palau, Micronesia, and the Marshall Islands, Philips used the Philishave trademark until 2006. Philips then dropped that name and began using the Philips name.

== History ==
From the early 1940s, Philco was legally able to prevent Philips from using the name "Philips" on any products marketed in the United States, because the two names were judged to sound similar enough to cause consumer confusion and potentially lead to claims of trademark infringement. This was made official and legally binding on January 19, 1943, when the court ruled in favor of the plaintiff in the corresponding case of Philco Corporation v. Philips Mfg. Co., that allowed Philco to prevent Philips from using their name on their products sold in the US. As a result, Philips instead used the name Norelco, an acronym for "North American Philips [electrical] Company". Philips continued to use that name for all their U.S. products until 1974, when Philips purchased The Magnavox Company. Philips then relabeled their U.S. consumer electronics products as Magnavox, but retained the Norelco name for their other U.S. products. When Philips bought Philco in 1981, Philips was able to freely use the Philips name for all of their U.S. products, but they chose to retain the Norelco name for personal care appliances, and the Magnavox name for economy-priced consumer electronics.

In 1980, Norelco increased its focus on small recorders production.

Norelco manufactured and sold the Clean Water Machine, a water purifier. From 1982 to 1986, Norelco sold more than 186,000 filters for its device that contaminated the water it filtered with the toxic solvent methylene chloride.

In 1982, Norelco acquired Schick brand.

In 1983, Remington settled its lawsuit against Norelco.

One reason for retaining the Norelco name for personal care appliances was that a shift to the Philips name could have alienated those American buyers who were reluctant to purchase foreign brands. The market share of Philips, a European company, was very low in the U.S. compared to other countries, but with their Norelco and Magnavox brands, they were able to get a larger market share.

Philips began co-branding their shavers "Philips Norelco" in 2005 to improve Philips' brand recognition in the United States, a first step towards an intended phasing out of the Norelco name.

== Norelco shavers ==
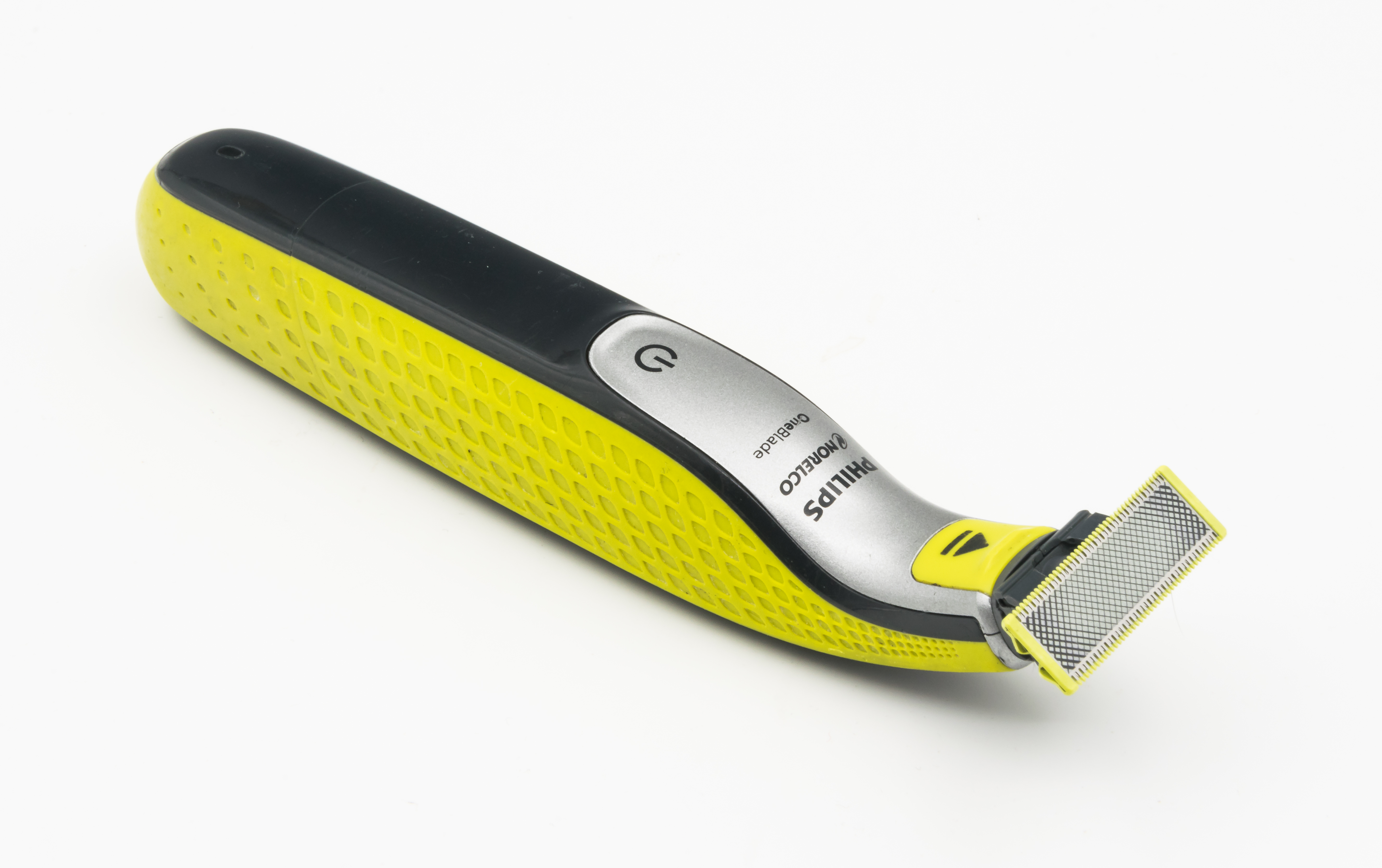
Philips Norelco OneBlade electric shaver

Philips began making electric shavers in 1939. World War II delayed their introduction in the United States until 1948. The product was not successful until a two-headed model was introduced in 1951.

In 1997, Norelco introduced Compact Travel Razor.

Philips introduced the Philips Norelco Bodygroom shaver for shaving male body hair in 2006. An online website as well as a demonstration on Howard Stern's show garnered attention. It was advertised in a science fiction series of adverts and shorts directed by Bruno Aveillan called Robotskin in 2007.

== Norelco video cameras ==
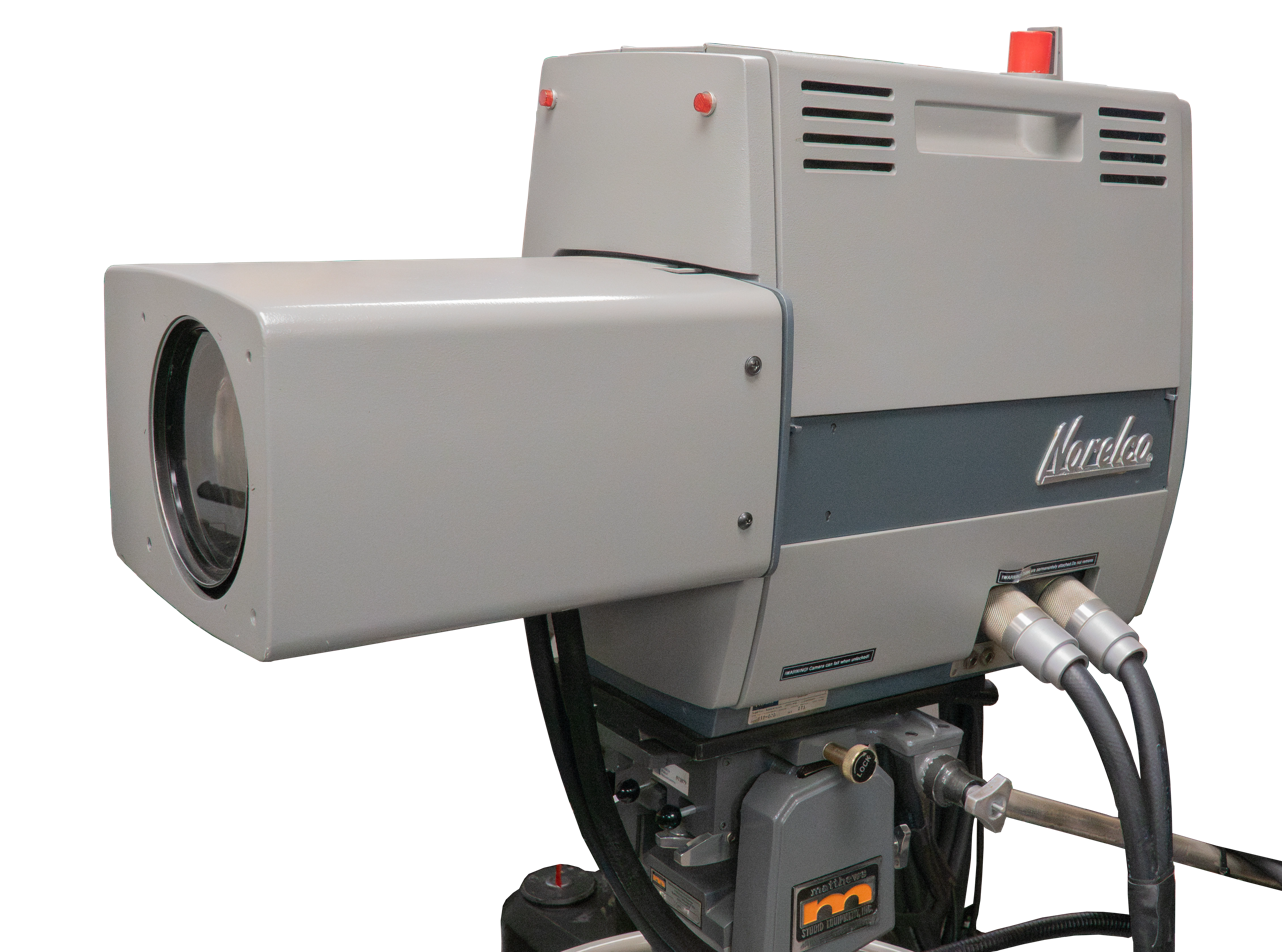
The Philips/Norelco PC-60 studio camera.

Philips made and marketed a line of Norelco professional video cameras in the United States in the 1960s and 1970s. CBS was a notable customer, using models PC-60, PC-70, PC-72, PCP-90, the LDH series, and later the LDK series. The PC-60 was notable as one of the first major color television cameras, competing with the RCA TK-40/41 line but eventually winning out as industry standard (so much so that NBC, which was owned by RCA, bought Norelco PC cameras for sports and outside broadcasts) due to its light weight, servo-operated zoom lens, and advanced color reproduction. By the 1980s, the Norelco name was dropped in favor of Philips. Later marketed using the BTS—Broadcast Television Systems Inc.—brand name in a joint venture with Bosch, the division was subsequently sold to Thomson's Grass Valley, then to Belden.

== Norelco tape recorders ==
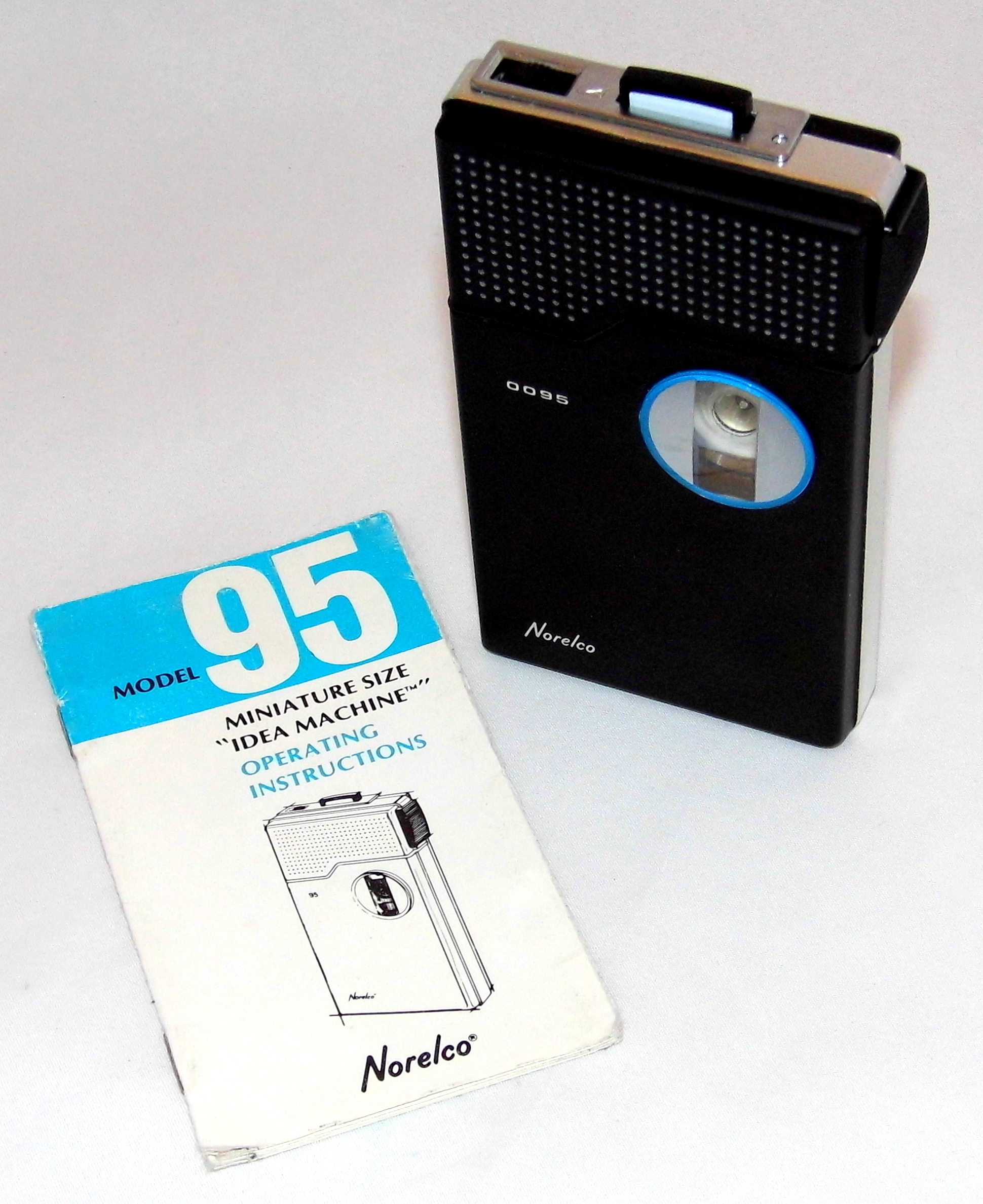
Norelco Model 95 Miniature Cassette Recorder, The Idea Machine, Made In Holland, Circa 1974

Norelco introduced the Philips 3 inch open reel portable tape player/recorder, being the EL 3586/25 in the United States under the Norelco brand name in November 1963. It was called the Continental 101.

== Presidents ==
- Dick Kress

== Criticism ==
Philips Norelco has been involved in multiple advertisement-related controversies. Its water filters were criticized by Consumer Reports for releasing methylene chloride.
