= IpDTL =

ipDTL is an IP codec that runs in a web browser, used for remote broadcasts in television, radio, and voice-over. It serves as a replacement for and is compatible with older ISDN audio codecs. Developed by former BBC sound engineer Kevin Leach, ipDTL uses the open-source codec OPUS and operates within web browsers, specifically Blink-based browsers like Google Chrome or Opera.

== History ==
ipDTL was invented by former BBC sound engineer Kevin Leach and uses the open-source codec OPUS since it first became available in the Google Chrome web browser. It enables higher audio quality than ISDN by accessing a website through a web browser. Audio quality of 72 kbit/s mono for voice contributors, 320 kbit/s for outside broadcasts with music, and 3 Mbit/s video at 1080p for video contributions on TV programs are possible. This technology was launched in 2013.

== Overview ==
ipDTL uses WebRTC and Web Audio technologies. It is designed primarily for Blink-based browsers like Google Chrome or Opera and runs on all platforms except iOS where these browsers are supported. The codecs used are Opus for audio and VP8 for video. The supported audio bandwidth is up to 320 kbit/s (stereo) and up to 3 Mbit/s for video (1080p).

Connections are established point-to-point and have DTLS encryption. Where a point-to-point connection is not possible, TURN relay servers are used to route the audio. TURN servers in the US, UK, Brazil, Australia, and Japan are available, with an independent backup system being maintained at ipdtl2.com. Connections can also be made through a special URL that allows users to access another account and connect with it. ipDTL uses a proprietary signaling method but also supports SIP for interoperability with other devices and applications such as Comrex Access and Media5-fone, and can transcode between Opus, G.722 and G.711. It also supports interoperability with legacy ISDN hardware via cloud-based bridging servers.

ipDTL powers hybrIP – a talk show system, which allows screening calls using any computer.

== See also ==
- Audio over IP
- Disruptive innovation
