= Georgina (name) =

Georgina is a given name and the feminine form of George, along with Georgia and Georgiana. It comes from the Greek word γεωργός (georgós; γέω, géo, "earth" + έργο, érgo, "work"), meaning "farmer".

The name's recent increase in usage, especially among Hispanic parents, has been attributed to the influence of Georgina Rodríguez, the subject of the Netflix series I Am Georgina in early 2022.

== People ==
- Georgina Andrews, Australian actress
- Georgina Bardach (born 1983), Argentine swimmer
- Georgina Beyer (1957–2023), New Zealand politician
- Georgina Bloomberg (born 1983), American equestrian
- Georgina Bouzova (born 1976), British actress
- Georgina Brandolini d'Adda (born 1949), French-Brazilian fashion executive
- Georgina Campbell (born 1992), English actress
- Georgina Castle (born 1992), English musical theatre actress
- Georgina Cates (born 1975), British actress
- Georgina Chang, Singaporean journalist
- Georgina Chapman (born 1976), British fashion designer and actress
- Georgina Coleridge (1916–2003), Scottish journalist, magazine editor and publishing executive
- Georgina Corrick (born 1999), British softball player
- Georgina de Albuquerque (1885–1962), Brazilian painter
- Georgina Downs (born 1972), British environmentalist
- Georgina Evers-Swindell (born 1978), New Zealand rower
- Georgina Febres-Cordero (1861–1925), Venezuelan nun
- Georgina Fitzalan-Howard, Duchess of Norfolk (born 1962)
- Georgina Gascoyne-Cecil, Marchioness of Salisbury (1827–1899)
- Georgina Gollock (1861–1940), Irish-born missionary, author
- Georgina Hagen (born 1991), British actress
- Georgina Haig (born 1985), Australian actress
- Georgina Hale (1943–2024), British actress
- Georgina Harland (born 1978), British athlete
- Georgina Hayden (born 1982), English chef and food writer
- Georgina Henry (1960–2014), British journalist
- Georgina Herrera (1936–2021), Cuban writer
- Georgina Hogarth (1827–1917), British housekeeper and editor
- Georgina Lázaro (born 1965), Puerto Rican poet
- Georgina Leonidas (born 1990), British actress
- Georgina Lewis (born 1974), Australian journalist
- Georgina Lightning (1963-2026), Cree director, writer and actress
- Georgina Mace (1953–2020), British scientist
- Georgina McGuinness (born 1966), Australian journalist
- Georgina Mello (1953–2023), Cape Verdean economist and director-general of the Community of Portuguese Language Countries
- Georgina Montagu, British journalist and author
- Georgina Pope (1862–1938), Canadian nurse
- Georgina Póta (born 1985), Hungarian table tennis player
- Georgina Reilly (born 1986), Canadian actress
- Georgina Rizk (born 1953), Lebanese model
- Georgina Rylance (born 1978), British actress
- Georgina Parkinson (1938–2009), English ballet dancer and ballet mistress
- Georgina Phillips, British actress
- Georgina Sherrington (born 1985), British actress
- Georgina Somerset (1923–2013), first openly intersex person in the United Kingdom
- Georgina Spelvin, (born 1936), stage name of Shelley Bob Graham, an American former pornographic actress and performer
- Georgina Starr (born 1968), British artist
- Georgina Stirling (1866–1935), Canadian opera singer
- Georgina Stojiljković (born 1988), Serbian fashion model
- Georgina Sutton (born 1961), Australian aviator
- Georgina Sweet (1875–1946), Australian zoologist
- Georgina te Heuheu (born 1943), New Zealand politician
- Georgina Trías Gil (born 1973), Spanish politician
- Georgina Verbaan (born 1979), Dutch actress and singer
- Georgina Ward, Countess of Dudley (1846–1929), British noblewoman
- Georgina Wheatcroft (born 1965), Canadian curler
- Georgina Theodora Wood (born 1947), Ghanaian judge

== Pseudonym ==
- Georgina Spelvin, variant on George Spelvin, a traditional American theatre pseudonym

== Fictional characters ==
- Georgina, a giraffe in the British-French children's television series 64 Zoo Lane
- Georgina Gressie, the titular character in Henry James's 1884 novella, Georgina's Reasons
- Georgina Jones, in the British television series Adam Adamant Lives!
- Georgina Kincaid, in novels by Richelle Mead
- Georgina Kirrin, nicknamed "George", in Enid Blyton's Famous Five series
- Georgina Orwell, in Lemony Snicket's A Series of Unfortunate Events book series
- Georgina Snootie, the mother of Ootsie and Bootsie Snootie in PB&J Otter
- Georgina Sparks, in the Gossip Girl books and television series
- Grandma Georgina, in Roald Dahl's 1964 book Charlie and the Chocolate Factory

== See also ==
- Georgina (disambiguation)
- Gina (given name)
- Jiřina
