= Georgia (name) =

- Gender: Female
- Language: English, Greek

Origin
- Language: Greek

Other names
- Variant forms: Georgiana, Georgina, Giorgia
- Pet names: Gee, Gia, George, Georgie
- Related names: Georgette, George, Jorja

Georgia is a feminine given name originating from the Greek word Γεωργία (Georgía), meaning "agriculture". It shares this origin with the masculine version of the name, George.

== People ==
=== Actresses ===
- Georgia Apostolou (1973–2016), Greek actress
- Georgia Caine (1876–1964), American actress
- Georgia Cayvan (1857–1906), American actress
- Georgia Ellis (1917–1988), American actress
- Georgia Engel (1948–2019), American actress
- Georgia May Foote (born 1991), British actress
- Georgia Groome (born 1992), British actress
- Georgia Hale (1905–1985), American actress
- Georgia Henshaw (born 1993), Welsh actress
- Georgia Jay, British actress
- Georgia King (born 1986), British actress
- Georgia Slowe (born 1966), English actress
- Georgia Steel (born 1998), English actress
- Georgia Taylor (born 1980), English actress
- Georgia Tennant (born 1984), English actress
- Georgia Vasileiadou (1897–1980), Greek actress

=== Athletes ===
- Georgia Abatzidou (born 1969), Greek long-distance runner
- Georgia Adams (born 1993), English cricketer
- Georgia Amoore (born 2001), Australian basketball player
- Georgia Bohl (born 1997), Australian swimmer
- Georgia Bonora (born 1990), Australian gymnast
- Georgia Campbell (1926–2004), American baseball player
- Georgia Dorotheou (born 1980), Greek handball player
- Georgia Downing (born 1999), British trampoline gymnast
- Georgia Ellinaki (born 1974), Greek water polo player
- Georgia Evans (footballer) (born 1995), Welsh footballer
- Georgia Glastris (born 1992), Greek figure skater
- Georgia Kokloni (born 1981), Greek sprinter
- Georgia (Tzina) Lamprousi (born 1993), Greek volleyball player
- Georgia Lara (born 1980), Greek water polo player
- Georgia Manoli (born 1983), Greek swimmer
- Georgia Marris (born 1996), New Zealand swimmer
- Georgia Munro-Cook (born 1994), Australian wheelchair basketball player
- Georgia Mullett (born 2005), English association footballer
- Georgia Schiff (born 2004), American ice hockey player
- Georgia Schweitzer (born 1979), American basketball player
- Georgia Sheffield (born 2005), British para swimmer
- Georgia Tsiliggiri (born 1972), Greek pole vaulter
- Georgia Tzanakaki (born 1980), Greek volleyball player
- Georgia Walker (born 1998), Australian rules footballer
- Georgia Wilson (field hockey) (born 1996), Australian field hockey player
- Georgia Wilson (equestrian) (born 1995), British para-equestrian
- Georgia Wilson (footballer) (born 2002), English footballer

=== Artists ===
- Georgia O'Keeffe (1887–1986), American artist
- Georgia Papageorge (born 1941), South African artist

=== Businesswomen ===
- Georgia Emery (1867–1931), American businesswoman
- Georgia Frontiere (1927–2008), American businesswoman

=== Musicians ===
- Georgia Mannion (born 2003), Australian singer-songwriter known professionally as George Alice
- Georgia Barnes (born 1990), British singer known mononymously as Georgia
- Georgia Brown (English singer) (1933–1992)
- Georgia Brown (Brazilian singer) (born 1980)
- Georgia Buchanan (born 1991), English singer and songwriter
- Georgia Carroll (1919–2011), American singer
- Georgia Ellery (born 1997), British violinist and singer
- Georgia Gibbs (1918–2006), American singer
- Georgia Holt (1926–2022), American singer
- Georgia Hubley (born 1960), percussionist, vocalist, founding member of Yo La Tengo
- Georgia Meek, British singer-songwriter
- Georgia Middleman (born 1967), American country singer
- Georgia Anne Muldrow, American singer and musician
- Georgia Spiropoulos (born 1965), Greek composer
- Georgia Turner (1921–1969), American singer
- Georgia White (1903–c.1980), American blues singer

=== Politicians and civil servants ===
- Georgia Gardner (born 1944), American politician
- Georgia Gould (born 1986), British politician
- Georgia Lee Lusk (1893–1971), American politician
- Georgia Davis Powers (1923–2016), American politician
- Georgia Thompson (born 1950), American civil servant

=== Writers ===
- Georgia Byng (born 1965), British author
- Georgia Douglas Johnson (1880–1966), American poet
- Georgia Makhlouf, Lebanese writer
- Georgia Toews, Canadian novelist

=== Others ===
- Georgia of Clermont (died 500), French saint and nun
- Georgia Hardstark (born 1980), American television and podcast host
- Georgia Harkness (1891–1974), American theologian
- Georgia May Jobson (1860–1924), American temperance reformer
- Georgia L. McMurray (1934–1992) American administrator and an activist for children, adolescents, and people with disabilities
- Georgia Oakley (born 1988), English film director and screenwriter
- Georgia B. Ridder (1914–2002), American racehorse owner
- Georgia Salpa (born 1985), Greek-Irish model
- Georgia Tann (1891–1950), American operator of a black market baby-adoption scheme

== See also ==
- Georgia (disambiguation)
