= Recording studio =

Facility for sound recording

Control room at the Tec de Monterrey, Mexico City Campus

A recording studio is a specialized facility for recording and mixing of instrumental or vocal musical performances, spoken words, and other sounds. They range in size from a small in-home project studio large enough to record a single singer-guitarist, to a large building with space for a full orchestra of 100 or more musicians. Ideally, both the recording and monitoring (listening and mixing) spaces are specially designed by an acoustician or audio engineer to achieve optimum acoustic properties (acoustic isolation or diffusion or absorption of reflected sound reverberation that could otherwise interfere with the sound heard by the listener).

Recording studios may be used to record singers, instrumental musicians (e.g., electric guitar, piano, saxophone, or ensembles such as orchestras), voice-over artists for advertisements or dialogue replacement in film, television, or animation, Foley, or to record their accompanying musical soundtracks. The typical recording studio consists of a room called the studio or live room equipped with microphones and mic stands, where instrumentalists and vocalists perform; and the control room, where audio engineers, sometimes with record producers, as well, operate professional audio mixing consoles, effects units, or computers with specialized software suites to mix, manipulate (e.g., by adjusting the equalization and adding effects) and route the sound for analog or digital recording. The engineers and producers listen to the live music and the recorded tracks on high-quality monitor speakers or headphones.

Often, there will be smaller rooms called isolation booths to accommodate loud instruments such as drums or electric guitar amplifiers and speakers, to keep these sounds from being audible to the microphones that are capturing the sounds from other instruments or voices, or to provide drier rooms for recording vocals or quieter acoustic instruments such as an acoustic guitar or a fiddle. Major recording studios typically have a range of large, heavy, and hard-to-transport instruments and music equipment in the studio, such as a grand piano, Hammond organ, electric piano, harp, and drums.

== Design and equipment ==
=== Layout ===
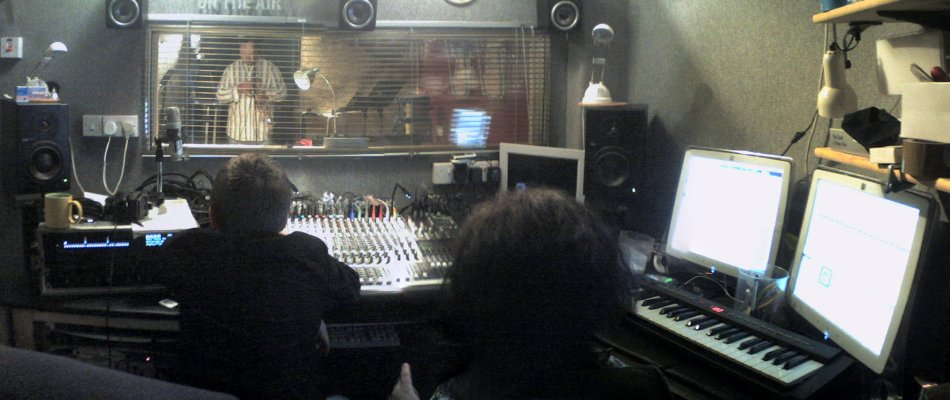
Engineers and producers watch a trumpet player from a window in the control room during a recording session.

Recording room 360° panoramic (view as a 360° interactive panorama)

Recording studios generally consist of three or more rooms:

- The live room of the studio is where instrumentalists play their instruments, with their playing picked up by microphones and, for electric and electronic instruments, by connecting the instruments' outputs or DI unit outputs to the mixing console as well as a place where vocalists may perform;
- Isolation booths, or sound enclosures, are either enclosed or partially enclosed areas built out of boxes or partitions or are completely separate small sound-insulated rooms with doors, designed for certain instrumentalists (or their loudspeaker stacks). Vocal booths are similarly designed rooms for singers. In both types of rooms, there are typically windows so the performers can see other band members and other studio staff, as singers, bandleaders and musicians often give or receive visual cues;
- The control room, or production/recording room, is where the audio engineers and record producers mix the mic and instrument signals with a mixing console. From here, they can record the singing and playing onto tape (until the 1980s and early 1990s) or hard disc (1990s and following decades) and listen to the recordings and tracks with monitor speakers or headphones and manipulate the tracks by adjusting the mixing console settings and by using effects units;
- The machine room, where noisier equipment, such as racks of fan-cooled computers, tape recorders and power amplifiers, is kept to prevent the noise from interfering with the recording or listening processes.

Even though sound isolation is a key goal, the musicians, singers, audio engineers and record producers still need to be able to see each other, to see cue gestures and conducting by a bandleader. As such, the live room, isolation booths, vocal booths and control room typically have windows.

Amplified instruments, like electric guitars, synthesizers, drum machines and keyboards, may be connected directly to the recording console using DI units and performance recorded in the control room. This greatly enhances the communication between the producer and engineer with the player, as studio mics, headphones and talkback are unnecessary.

Recording studios are carefully designed around the principles of room acoustics to create a set of spaces with the acoustical properties required for recording sound with accuracy. Architectural acoustics includes acoustical treatment and soundproofing and also the consideration of the physical dimensions of the room itself to make the room respond to sound in the desired way. Acoustical treatment includes and the use of absorption and diffusion materials on the surfaces inside the room. To control the amount of reverberation, rooms in a recording studio may have a reconfigurable combination of reflective and non-reflective surfaces. Soundproofing provides sonic isolation between rooms and prevents sound from entering or leaving the property. A Recording studio in an urban environment must be soundproofed on its outer shell to prevent noises from the surrounding streets and roads from being picked up by microphones inside.

=== Equipment ===
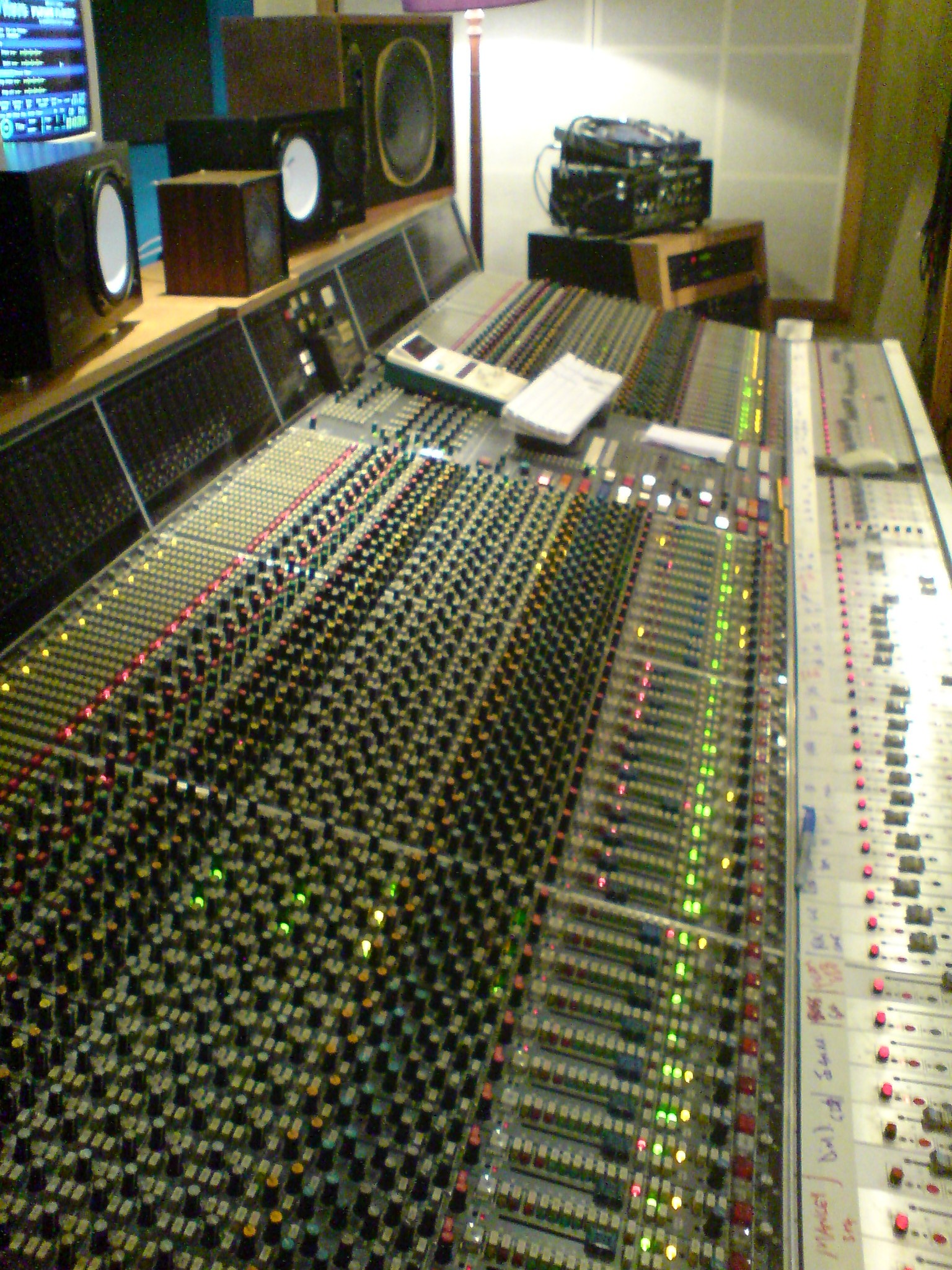
Neve VR60, a multitrack mixing console. Above the console are a range of studio monitor speakers.

A recording studio is typically equipped with a range of professional tools designed to capture, mix, and refine audio. At the heart of the studio is a professional-grade mixing console, which serves as the central hub for managing audio signals. To accommodate additional input sources, such as when miking a full drum kit and all channels on the main console are occupied, smaller auxiliary mixing consoles may be used to expand channel capacity.

Microphone preamplifiers are essential for boosting mic-level signals to a usable level, and audio is usually captured using either a multitrack recorder or a digital audio workstation (DAW) running on a computer. A wide selection of microphones is available, each chosen for its suitability with different instruments or vocal styles, and direct input (DI) boxes are used to connect instruments directly to the console or interface.

Microphone stands allow for precise placement of mics in front of vocalists, instrumentalists, or ensembles, while studio monitors and closed-back monitoring headphones are used for critically listening to recordings without sound leakage. Lighted signs reading On Air or Recording are often installed to signal when silence is needed in the studio.

To shape the sound further, engineers may employ outboard effects units such as dynamic range compression, reverbs, and equalizers. Music stands are also commonly found in the studio to hold sheet music for performers during recording sessions.

=== Instruments ===
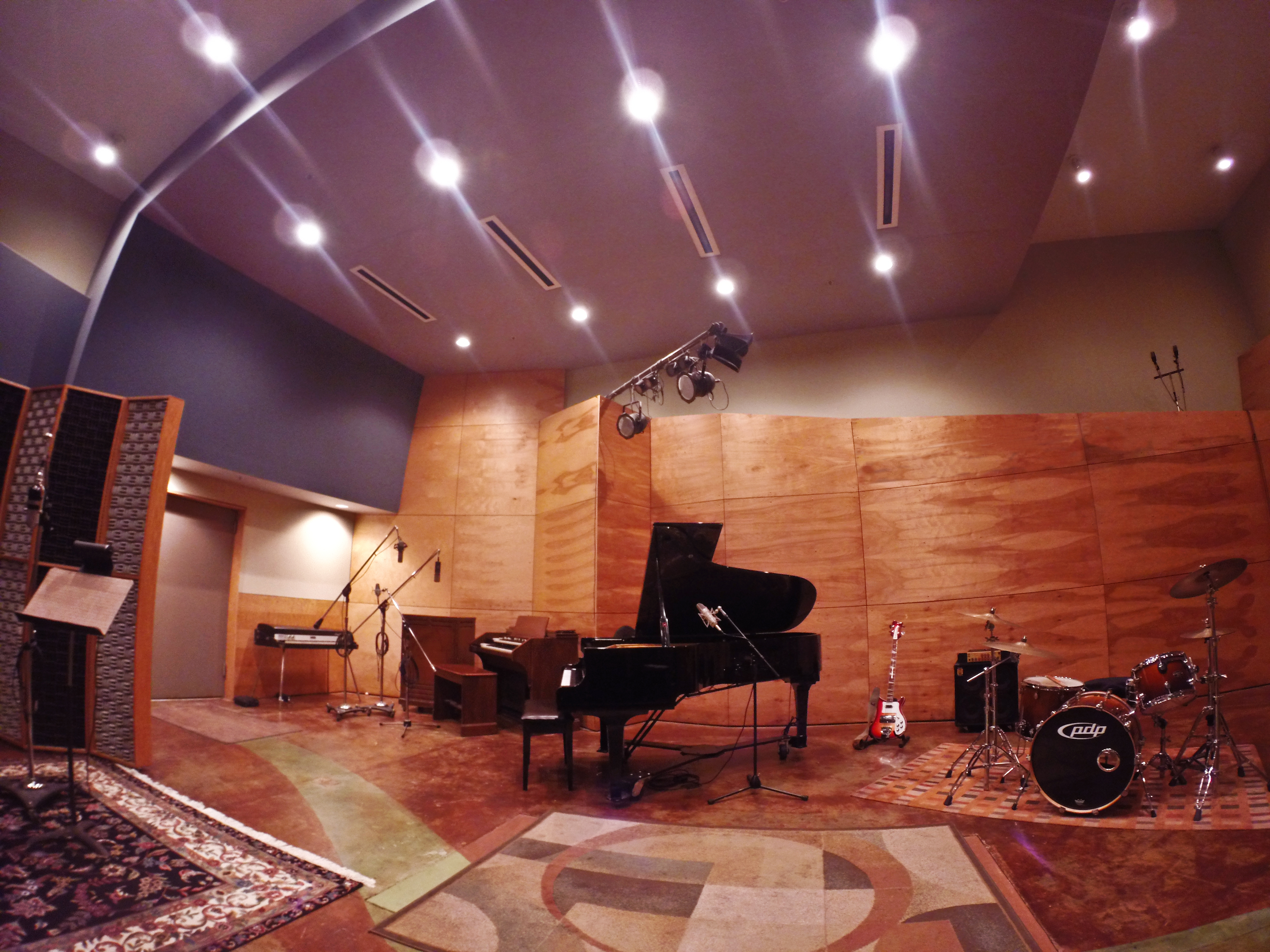
A selection of instruments at a music studio, including a grand piano

Not all music studios are equipped with musical instruments. Some smaller studios do not have instruments, and bands and artists are expected to bring their own instruments, amplifiers, and speakers. However, major recording studios often have a selection of instruments in their live room, typically instruments, amplifiers and speaker cabinets that are large, heavy, and difficult to transport (e.g., a Hammond organ) or infeasible (as in the case of a grand piano) to hire for a single recording session. Having musical instruments and equipment in the studio creates additional costs for a studio, as pianos have to be tuned and instruments and associated equipment needs to be maintained.

== Digital audio workstations ==
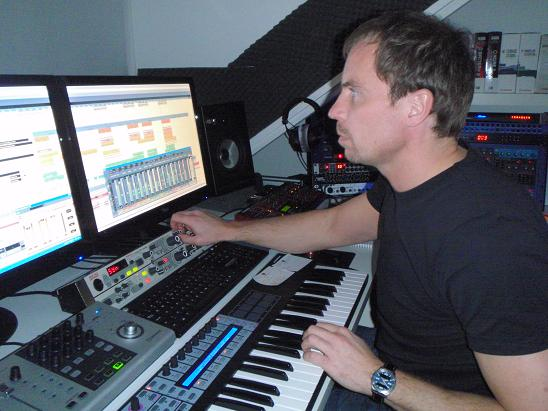
Music production using a digital audio workstation (DAW) with multi-monitor set-up

General-purpose computers rapidly assumed a large role in the recording process. With software, a computer can replace the mixing consoles, multitrack recording equipment, synthesizers, samplers and effects unit (reverb, echo, compression, etc.) that a recording studio required in the 1980s and 1990s. A computer thus outfitted is called a digital audio workstation, or DAW.

While Apple Macintosh is used for most studio work, there is a breadth of software available for Microsoft Windows and Linux.

If no mixing console is used and all mixing is done using only a keyboard and mouse, this is referred to as mixing in the box (ITB). OTB describes mixing with other hardware and not just the PC software.

== Project studios ==
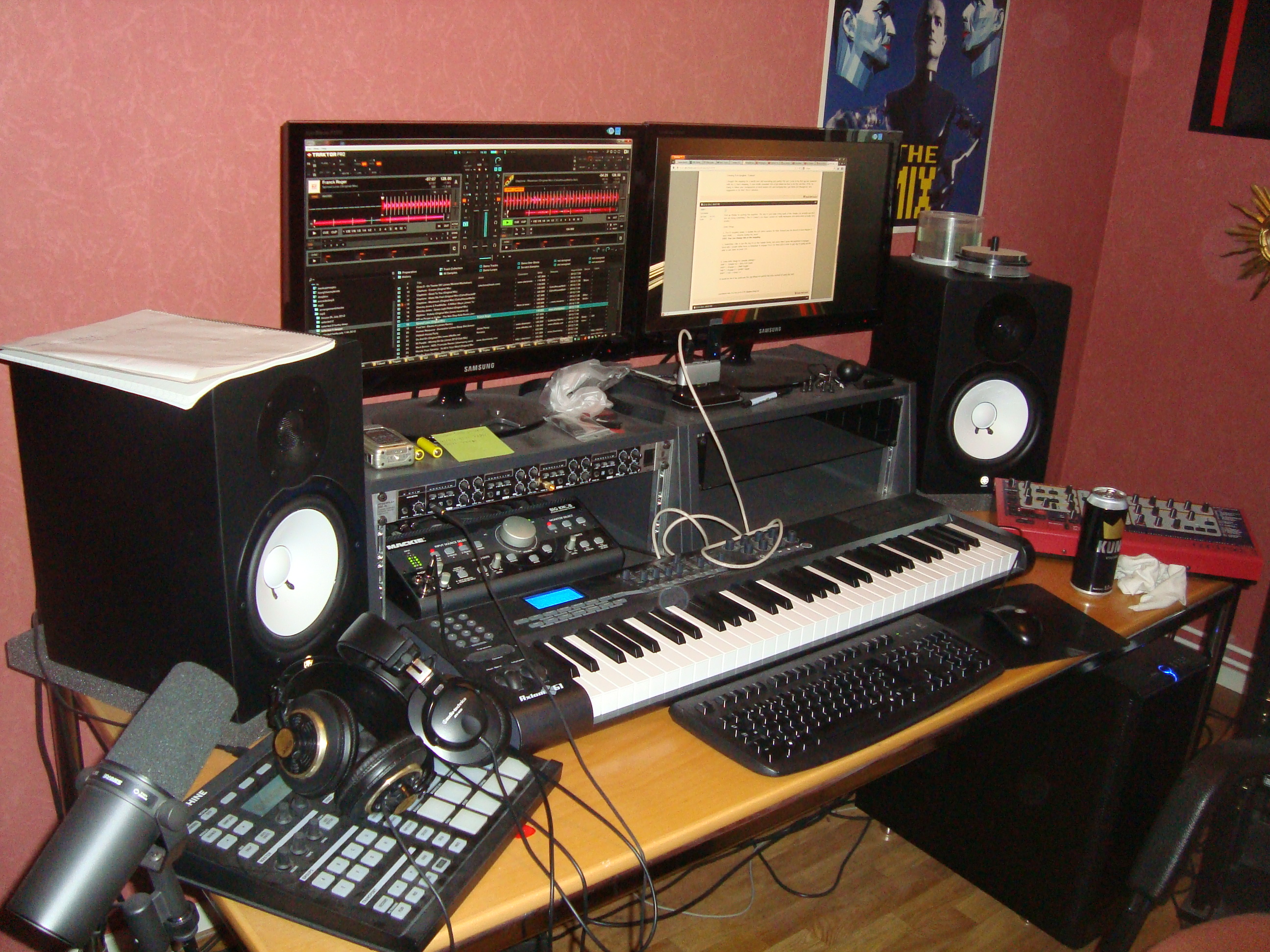
Home studio setup

A small, personal recording studio is sometimes called a project studio or home studio. Such studios often cater to the specific needs of an individual artist or are used as a non-commercial hobby. The first modern project studios came into being during the mid-1980s, with the advent of affordable multitrack recording devices, synthesizers and microphones. The phenomenon has flourished with falling prices of MIDI equipment and accessories, as well as inexpensive direct to disk recording products.

Recording drums and amplified electric guitar in a home studio is challenging because they are usually the loudest instruments. Acoustic drums require sound isolation in this scenario, unlike electronic or sampled drums. Getting an authentic electric guitar amp sound, including power-tube distortion, requires a power attenuator or an isolation cabinet, or booth. A convenient compromise is amplifier modeling, whether a modeling amp, preamp/processor, or software-based guitar amp simulator. Sometimes, musicians replace loud, inconvenient instruments such as drums with keyboards, which today often provide somewhat realistic sampling.

The capability of digital recording introduced by ADAT and its comparatively low cost, originally introduced at $3995, were largely responsible for the rise of project studios in the 1990s. Today's project studios are built around software-based DAWs running on standard PC hardware.

== Isolation booth ==
An isolation booth is either a partially enclosed area in the live room (Note: Partitions can be set up in a variety of ways, whether to achieve complete or partial separation. Isolation booths set up with partitions are usually temporary and can be taken apart, then used other ways for different sessions.) or a completely separate small room built adjacent to the live room that is both soundproofed to keep out external sounds and keep in the internal sounds. Like all other recording rooms in the sound industry, isolation booths are designed to minimize the amount of diffused reflections from walls, creating a good-sounding room. A drummer, vocalist, or guitar speaker cabinet, along with microphones, is acoustically isolated in the isolation booth. A typical professional recording studio today has a control room, a large live room, and one or more small isolation booths.

All rooms are soundproofed by varying methods, including but not limited to, double-layer 5/8" sheetrock with the seams offset from layer to layer on both sides of the wall that is filled with foam, batten insulation, a double wall, which is an insulated wall built next to another insulated wall with an air gap in-between, by adding foam to the interior walls and corners, and by using two panes of thick glass with an air gap between them. The surface densities of common building materials determine the transmission loss of various frequencies through materials.

Thomas A. Watson invented, but did not patent, the soundproof booth for use in demonstrating the telephone with Alexander Graham Bell in 1877. There are variations of the same concept, including a portable standalone isolation booth and a guitar speaker isolation cabinet. A gobo panel achieves the same effect to a much more moderate extent; for example, a drum kit that is too loud in the live room or on stage can have acrylic glass see-through gobo panels placed around it to deflect the sound and keep it from bleeding into the other microphones, allowing better independent control of each instrument channel at the mixing console.

In animation, vocal performances are normally recorded in individual sessions, and the actors have to imagine (with the help of the director or a reader) they are involved in dialogue. Animated films often evolve rapidly during both development and production, so keeping vocal tracks from bleeding into each other is essential to preserving the ability to fine-tune lines up to the last minute. Sometimes, if the rapport between the lead actors is strong enough and the animation studio can afford it, the producers may use a recording studio configured with multiple isolation booths in which the actors can see each other and the director. This enables the actors to react to one another in real time as if they were on a regular stage or film set.

== History ==
=== 1890s to 1930s ===
In the era of acoustical recordings (prior to the introduction of microphones, electrical recording and amplification), the earliest recording studios were very basic facilities, being essentially soundproof rooms that isolated the performers from outside noise. During this era it was not uncommon for recordings to be made in any available location, such as a local ballroom, using portable acoustic recording equipment. In this period, master recordings were made by cutting a rotating cylinder (later disc) made from wax. Performers were typically grouped around a large acoustic horn (an enlarged version of the familiar gramophone horn). The acoustic energy from the voices or instruments was channeled through the horn to a diaphragm to a mechanical cutting lathe, which inscribed the signal as a modulated groove directly onto the surface of the master.

=== 1930s to 1970s ===
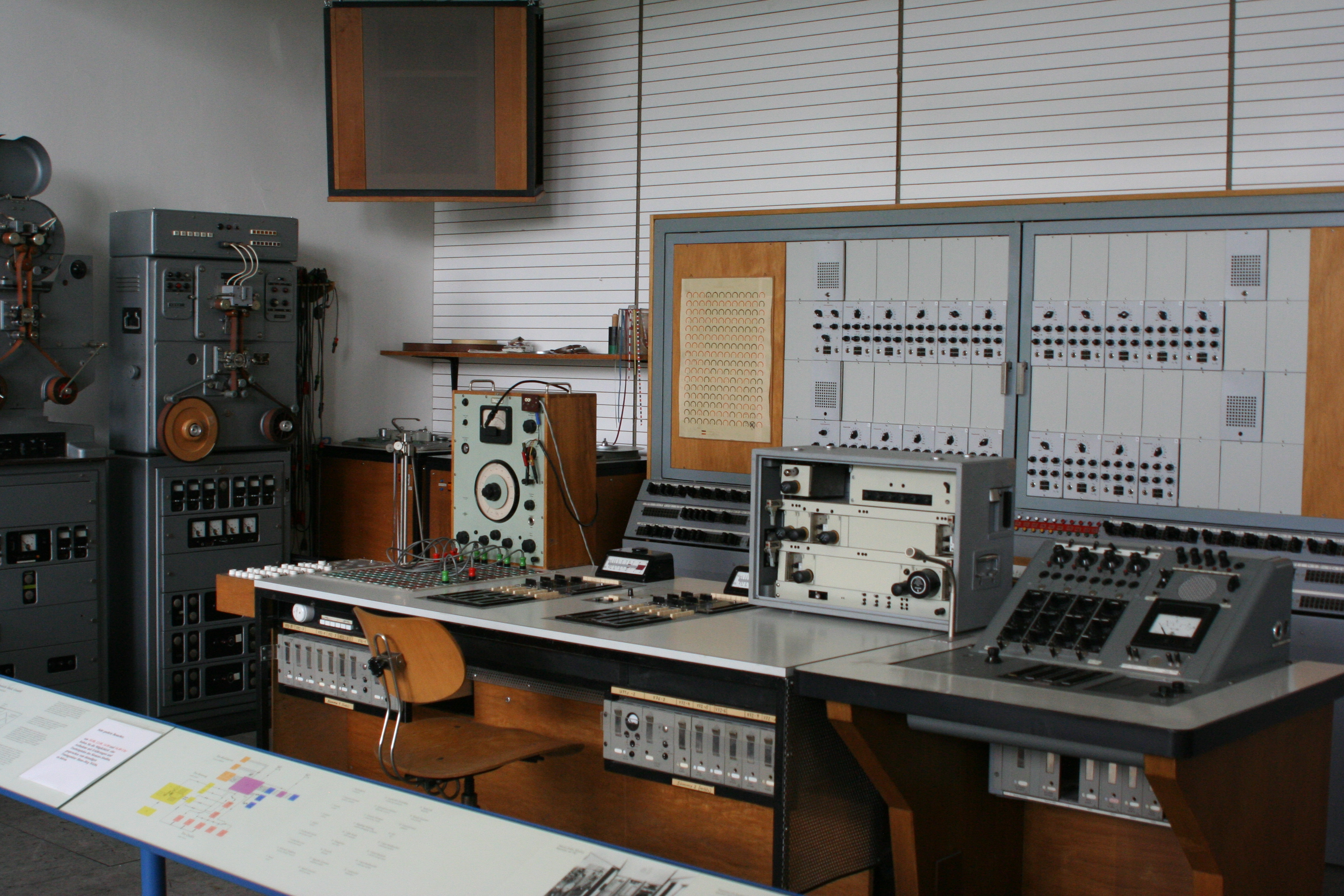
The Siemens Studio for Electronic Music c. 1956

Electrical recording was common by the early 1930s, and mastering lathes were electrically powered, but master recordings still had to be cut into a disc, by now a lacquer, also known as an Acetate disc. In line with the prevailing musical trends, studios in this period were primarily designed for the live recording of symphony orchestras and other large instrumental ensembles. Engineers soon found that large, reverberant spaces like concert halls created a vibrant acoustic signature as the natural reverb enhanced the sound of the recording. In this period, large, acoustically live halls were favored, rather than the acoustically dead booths and studio rooms that became common after the 1960s. Because of the limits of the recording technology, which did not allow for multitrack recording techniques, studios of the mid-20th century were designed around the concept of grouping musicians (e.g., the rhythm section or a horn section) and singers (e.g., a group of backup singers), rather than separating them, and placing the performers and the microphones strategically to capture the complex acoustic and harmonic interplay that emerged during the performance. In the 2000s, modern sound stages still sometimes use this approach for large film scoring projects that use large orchestras.

==== Halls and churches ====
Because of their superb acoustics, many of the larger studios were converted churches. Examples include George Martin's AIR Studios in London, Columbia Records 30th Street Studio in New York City, and Pythian Temple studio in New York.

Facilities like the Columbia Records 30th Street Studio in New York and Abbey Road Studios in London were renowned for their identifiable sound—which was (and still is) easily identifiable by audio professionals—and for the skill of their staff engineers. As the need to transfer audio material between different studios grew, there was an increasing demand for standardization in studio design across the recording industry, and Westlake Recording Studios in West Hollywood was highly influential in the 1970s in the development of standardized acoustic design.

In New York City, Columbia Records had some of the most highly respected sound recording studios, including the 30th Street Studio at 207 East 30th Street, the CBS Studio Building at 49 East 52nd Street, Liederkranz Hall at 111 East 58th Street between Park and Lexington Avenues (a building built by and formerly belonging to a German cultural and musical society, The Liederkranz Club and Society), and one of their earliest recording studios, Studio A at 799 Seventh Avenue.

==== Technologies and techniques ====
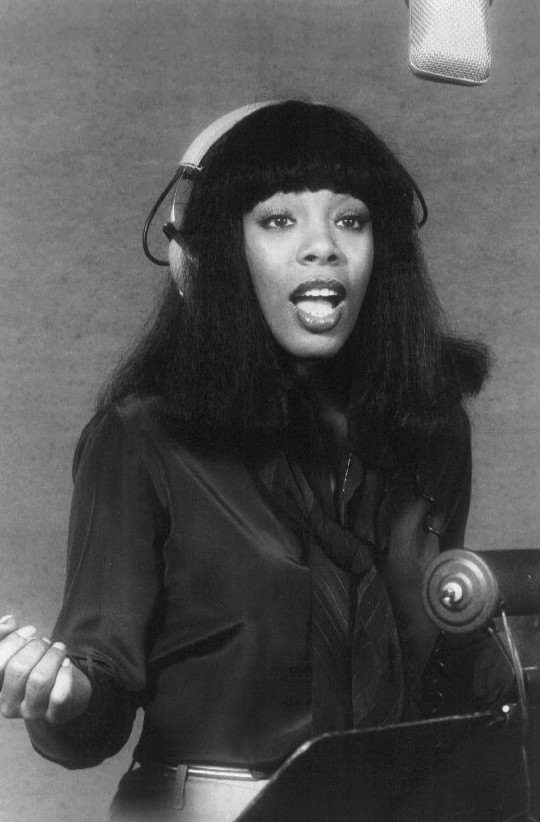
Donna Summer wearing headphones during a recording session in 1977

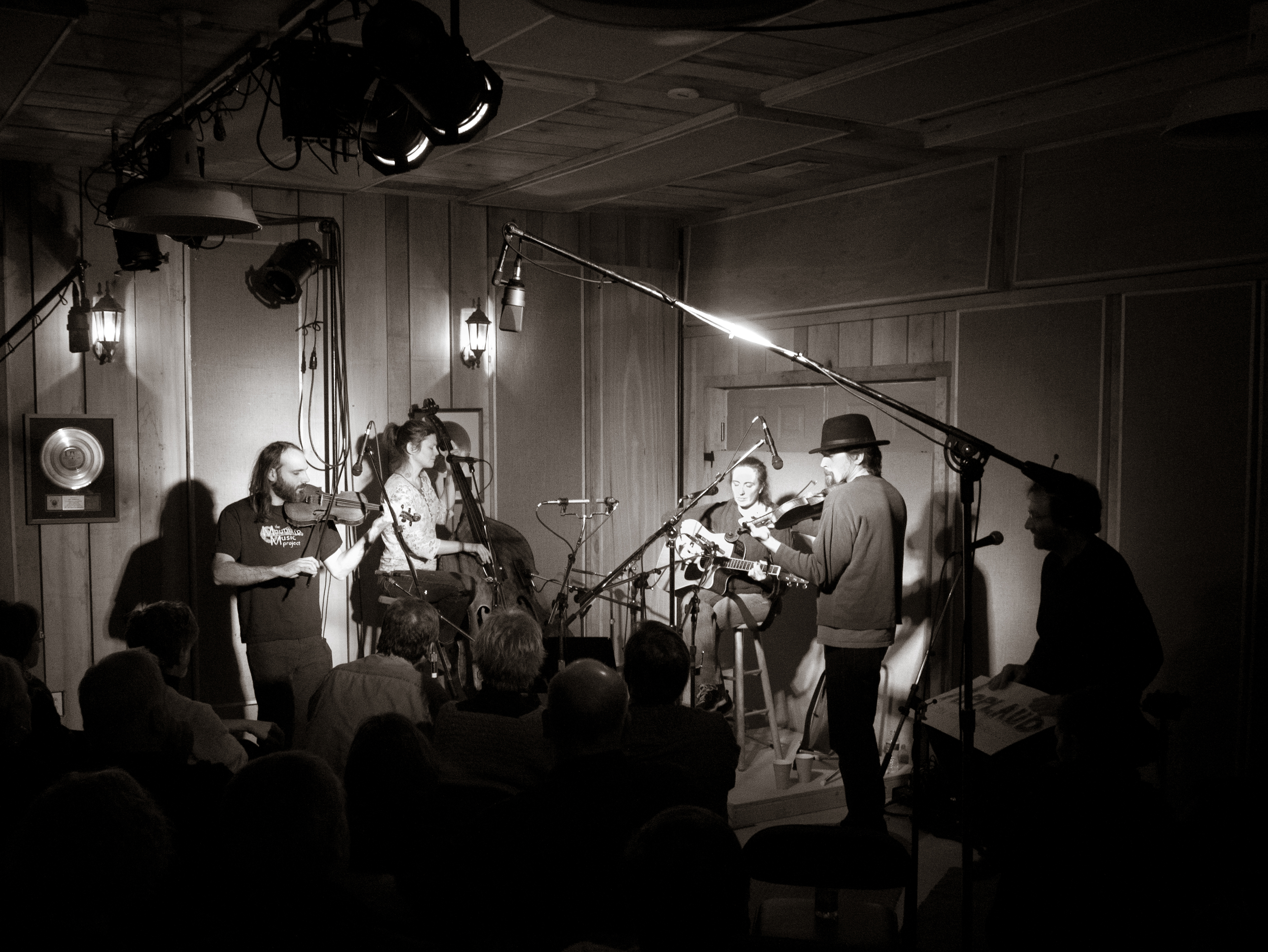
Danny Knicely records with Furnace Mountain Band in Virginia (2012)

Electric recording studios in the mid-20th century often lacked isolation booths, sound baffles, and sometimes even speakers. A major reason that isolation was not used was that recordings in this period were typically made as live ensemble takes and all the performers needed to be able to see each other and the ensemble leader while playing. The recording engineers who trained in this period learned to take advantage of the complex acoustic effects that could be created through leakage between different microphones and groups of instruments, and these technicians became extremely skilled at capturing the unique acoustic properties of their studios and the musicians in performance. It was not until the 1960s, with the introduction of high-fidelity headphones, that it became common practice for performers to use these to monitor their performance during recording and listen to playbacks.

The use of different kinds of microphones and their placement around the studio is a crucial part of the recording process, and particular brands of microphones are used by engineers for their specific audio characteristics. The smooth-toned ribbon microphones developed by the RCA company in the 1930s were crucial to the crooning style perfected by Bing Crosby, and the famous Neumann U 47 condenser microphone was one of the most widely used from the 1950s. This model is still widely regarded by audio professionals as one of the best microphones of its type ever made. Learning the correct placement of microphones is a major part of the training of young engineers, and many have become extremely skilled in this craft. Well into the 1960s, in the classical field, it was not uncommon for engineers to make high-quality orchestral recordings using only one or two microphones suspended above the orchestra. In the 1960s, engineers began experimenting with placing microphones much closer to instruments than had previously been the norm. The distinctive rasping tone of the horn sections on the Beatles recordings "Good Morning Good Morning" and "Lady Madonna" were achieved by having the saxophone players position their instruments so that microphones were virtually inside the mouth of the horn.

The unique sonic characteristics of the major studios imparted a special character to many of the most famous popular recordings of the 1950s and 1960s, and the recording companies jealously guarded these facilities. According to sound historian David Simons, after Columbia took over the 30th Street Studios in the late 1940s and A&R manager Mitch Miller had tweaked it to perfection, Miller issued a standing order that the drapes and other fittings were not to be touched, and the cleaners had specific orders never to mop the bare wooden floor for fear it might alter the acoustic properties of the hall. There were several other features of studios in this period that contributed to their unique sonic signatures.

As well as the inherent sound of the large recording rooms, many of the best studios incorporated specially designed echo chambers, purpose-built rooms which were often built beneath the main studio. These were typically long, low rectangular spaces constructed from hard, sound-reflective materials like concrete, fitted with a loudspeaker at one end and one or more microphones at the other. During a recording session, a signal from one or more of the microphones in the studio could be routed to the loudspeaker in the echo chamber; the sound from the speaker reverberated through the chamber and the enhanced signal was picked up by the microphone at the other end. This echo-enhanced signal, which was often used to sweeten the sound of vocals, could then be blended in with the primary signal from the microphone in the studio and mixed into the track as the master recording was being made.

Special equipment was another notable feature of the classic recording studio. In the US, the biggest studios were owned and operated by large media companies like RCA and Columbia, who typically had their own electronics research and development divisions that designed and built custom-made recording equipment and mixing consoles for their studios. Likewise, the smaller independent studios were often owned by skilled electronics engineers who designed and built their own desks and other equipment. A good example of this is Gold Star Studios in Los Angeles, the site of many famous American pop recordings of the 1960s. Co-owner David S. Gold built the studio's main mixing desk and many additional pieces of equipment and he also designed the studio's unique trapezoidal echo chambers.

In Europe, the biggest studios were mostly operated by the national broadcast companies such as ZDF and the ARD (Germany), RAI (Italy) or the BBC (UK) with few exceptions such as EMI, Polydor/Polygram or DGG which operated their own, large recording facilities. Although having their own technical departments, most of the equipment was supplied through companies such as Telefunken, Siemens, Neumann and EMT.

During the 1950s and 1960s, the sound of pop recordings was further defined by the introduction of proprietary sound processing devices such as equalizers and compressors, which were manufactured by specialist electronics companies. One of the best known of these was the Pultec equalizer, which was used by almost all the major commercial studios of the time and the 1176 peak limiter, developed by Bill Putnam.

==== Multi-track recording ====
With the introduction of multi-track recording, it became possible to record instruments and singers separately and at different times on different tracks on tape. In the mid-20th century, recordings were analog, made on 1/4-inch or 1/2-inch magnetic tape, or, more rarely, on 35 mm magnetic film, with multitrack recording reaching 8 tracks in the 1950s, 16 in 1968, and 32 in the 1970s. The most common such tape is the 2-inch analog, capable of containing up to 24 individual tracks. Throughout the 1960s, many pop classics were still recorded live in a single take. In the 1970s, the large recording companies began to adopt multi-track recording and the emphasis shifted to isolation and soundproofing, with treatments like echo and reverberation added separately during the mixing process, rather than being blended in during the recording. Generally, after an audio mix is set up on a 24-track tape machine, the tracks are played back together, mixed and sent to a different machine, which records the combined signals (called printing) to a 1/2-inch two-track stereo tape, called a master.

Before digital recording, the total number of available tracks onto which one could record was measured in multiples of 24, based on the number of 24-track tape machines being used. Most recording studios now use digital recording equipment, which limits the number of available tracks only on the basis of the mixing console's or computer hardware interface's capacity and the ability of the hardware to cope with processing demands. Analog tape machines are still used in some cases for their unique sonic characteristics.

== Radio studios ==
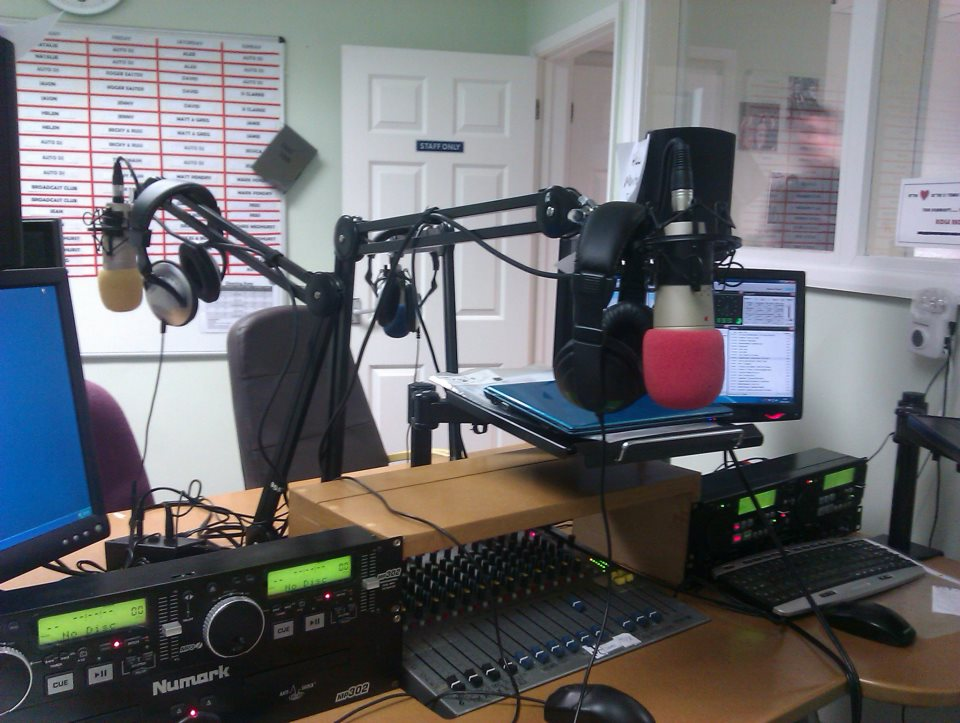
The studio at Ridge Radio in Caterham, England

Radio studios are very similar to recording studios, particularly in the case of production studios which are not normally used on-air, such as studios where interviews are taped for later broadcast. This type of studio would normally have all of the same equipment that any other audio recording studio would have, particularly if it is at a large station, or at a combined facility that houses a station group, but is also designed for groups of people to work collaboratively in a live-to-air situation.

Broadcast studios also use many of the same principles, such as sound isolation, with adaptations suited to the live on-air nature of their use. Such equipment would commonly include a telephone hybrid for putting telephone calls on the air, a POTS codec for receiving remote broadcasts, a dead air alarm for detecting unexpected silence, and a broadcast delay for dropping anything from coughs to profanity. In the U.S., stations licensed by the Federal Communications Commission (FCC) also must have an Emergency Alert System decoder (typically in the studio), and in the case of full-power stations, an encoder that can interrupt programming on all channels which a station transmits to broadcast urgent warnings.

Computers are used for playing ads, jingles, bumpers, soundbites, phone calls, sound effects, traffic and weather reports, and now are able to perform full broadcast automation when no staff are present. Digital mixing consoles can be interconnected via audio over Ethernet. Network connections allow remote access, so that DJs can do shows from a home studio via the Internet. Additional outside audio connections are required for the studio/transmitter link for radio stations, satellite dishes for sending and receiving shows, and for webcasting or podcasting.

== See also ==
- Remote recording – mobile control room truck for on-location recording
- Film studio
- List of music software
- Re-amp
- Recording studio as an instrument
- Talkback (recording)
- Television studio
