= Vocal music =

Genre of music performed by one or more singers

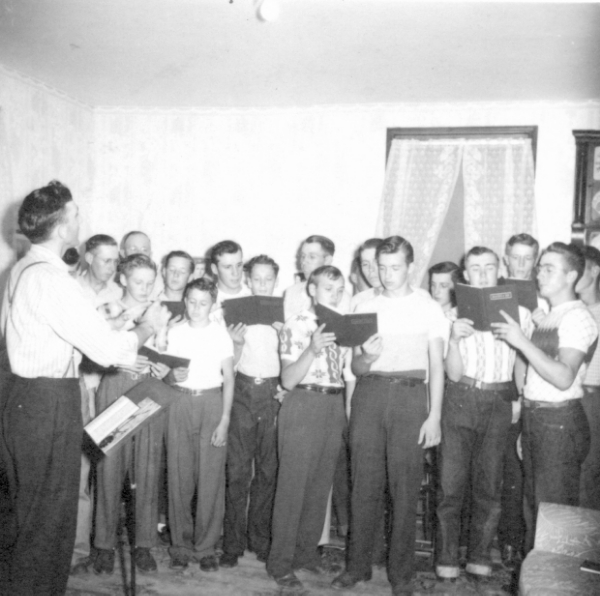
A men's chorus from the 1940s or 1950s

Vocal music is a type of singing performed by one or more singers, either with instrumental accompaniment or without instrumental accompaniment (a cappella), in which singing provides the main focus of the piece. Music which employs singing but does not feature it prominently is generally considered to be instrumental music (e.g. the wordless women's choir in the final movement of Holst's symphonic work The Planets) as is music without singing. Music without any non-vocal instrumental accompaniment is referred to as a cappella.

Vocal music typically features sung words called lyrics, although there are notable examples of vocal music that are performed using non-linguistic syllables, sounds, or noises, sometimes as musical onomatopoeia, such as jazz scat singing. A short piece of vocal music with lyrics is broadly termed a song, although in different styles of music, it may be called an aria or hymn.

Vocal music often has a sequence of sustained pitches that rise and fall, creating a melody, but some vocal styles use less distinct pitches, such as chants or a rhythmic speech-like delivery, such as rapping. As well, there are extended vocal techniques that may be used, such as screaming, growling, throat singing, or yodelling. Vocal music is probably the oldest form of music, since it does not require any instrument besides the human voice. All musical cultures have some variation of vocal music.

== Vocal music without lyrics ==
=== World traditions ===
- Indian classical music is based on a rich vocal tradition, wherein even instruments are evaluated on their ability to follow the human voice, imitate it, or recreate the same expressions.
- Elaborate untexted vocal improvisation was and still is an important element in Turkish and Middle Eastern music traditions. Such music existed prior to the 13th century and the First Crusade into Palestine and the city of Jerusalem, possibly even before the year 900.
- The modern descendants of the ancient Kung tribes and clans of Southern Africa utilize similar traditional music techniques.
- A form of improvisation known as thillana is a very important feature of Carnatic music from South India.
- Tuvan throat singing often features wordless and improvised song. The sygyt technique is a particularly good example of this.
- The Anglo-Saxon and Gaelic communities.
- Hasidic Jews use a form of voice improvisation called nigunim. This consists of wordless tunes vocalized with sounds such as "Bim-bim-bam" or "Ai-yai-yai!" often accompanied by rhythmic clapping and drumming on the table.
- Puirt a beul, also known as "Mouth Music", is a Scottish vocal technique imitating the sounds of bagpipes, fiddles, and other instruments used in traditional Scottish music. It was popularized in North America by Scottish immigrants, and has been incorporated into many forms of American music from roots music to bluegrass.
- The Cante Alentejano is just based on vocal music. It is one of two Portuguese music traditions part of the UNESCO Intangible Cultural Heritage Lists, the other being Fado.

=== European classical vocal music ===
Solfege, a vocalized musical scale, assigns various syllables such as "Do-Re-Mi" to each note. A variety of similar tools are found in traditional Indian music, and scat singing of jazz.

=== Jazz and popular music ===
Hip-hop has a very distinct form of vocal percussion known as beatboxing. It involves creating beats, rhythms, and scratching.

The singer of the Icelandic group Sigur Rós, Jón Þór Birgisson, often uses vocals without words, as does Icelandic singer/songwriter, Björk. Her album Medúlla is composed entirely of processed and acoustic vocal music, including beatboxing, choral arrangements, and throat singing.

Singer Bobby McFerrin has recorded a number of albums using only his voice and body, sometimes consisting of a texted melody supported by untexted vocalizations.

== Vocal music with lyrics ==
=== Songs ===
See Category:Song forms for short forms of music with words that are sung.

=== Extended techniques that involve lyrics ===
The Second Viennese School, especially Alban Berg and Arnold Schoenberg, pioneered a technique called Sprechstimme in which singers are half-talk, half-sing, and only approximate pitches.

== Wide-ranging voices ==
- Adam Lopez – E♭2 to E♭8
- Ariana Grande: C♯3 – E7
- Avi Kaplan: E♭1 – F♯5
- Axl Rose: F1 – B♭6.
- Beyoncé – G#2 to F6
- Cher: C3 – E6
- Clara Butt: A2 – B♭5
- Daniel Gildenlöw: A1 – A5. Top range may be heard on songs such as "Dea Pecuniae", "A Trace of Blood" or "This Heart of Mine"; for low range, "Imago", "Of Dust" and "Beyond the Pale" are good examples.
- Dimash Kudaibergen: F#1 - D8.
- Elizabeth Billington: A3 – A6.
- Elvis Presley: B1 – A5. Presley's B1 may be heard on the song "Such a Night", and on "Mystery Train" an A5 is reached towards the end. Towards his later career, he developed a rich baritone voice which still mastered the higher register with immense power, such as on "An American Trilogy", "Unchained Melody" or the joking "Little Darlin'".
- Ewa Podleś: A2 – E♭6.
- Farinelli: C3 – C6.
- Freddie Mercury: F2 – E♭6. Mercury's F2 can be heard in the backing vocals of "All Dead, All Dead," and his E♭6 was done at various live performances.
- Frankie Valli: F#2 – G#5.
- Georgia Brown – G2 to G10
- Isabella Colbran: F#3 – E6.
- Lisa Gerrard: A2 to F#5.
- Lucrezia Aguiari: C4 – C7.
- Mado Robin: B3 – D7.
- Manuel García: G2 – D5.
- Maria Callas: F♯3 – F6. In his review of Callas's June 11, 1951 concert in Florence, music critic Rock Ferris of Musical Courier said, "Her high E's and F's are taken full voice." In a 1969 French television interview with Pierre Desgraupes on the program L'invité du dimanche, La Scala's maestro Francesco Siciliani speaks of Callas's voice going to high F.
- Maria Malibran: E♭3 – E6.
- Mariah Carey: F♯2 – F♯8. Carey has hit an F♯2 while singing "You and I" live and an F♯8 while swimming with a dolphin, making her vocal range exactly six octaves and one of the biggest in popular music history.
- Michael Jackson: E♭2 – B♭6
- Prince: A1 – G♯7
- Tim Buckley: F♯2 – A5
- Tim Storms: G♯−5 – G♯5
- Yma Sumac: her range was said to be "well over four octaves" and was sometimes claimed to span even five octaves at her peak. From A2 to B♭7

== See also ==
- Choir
- Human Voice
- National Center for Voice and Speech
- Phonation
- Vocable
- Vocal registration
- Vocaloid
