= Georgina =

Georgina may refer to:

== Names ==
- Georgina (name), a feminine given name

== Places ==
=== Australia ===
- Georgina, Queensland, a locality in the Shire of Boulia, Queensland
- Georgina Basin, a large sedimentary basin in Australia
- Georgina River, a river which drains the Georgina Basin

=== Canada ===
- Georgina, Ontario, a town in south-central Ontario, Canada
  - Georgina Ice, a Junior Hockey team in Georgina, Ontario
  - Georgina Public Libraries, the public library system of Georgina, Ontario
- Georgina Island, an island and First Nations reserve in Lake Simcoe offshore of Georgina, Ontario

== Other ==
- Georgina (grasshopper), a genus of grasshoppers in the family Episactidae
- Georgina, a synonym for the plant genus Dahlia

== See also ==
- Georgia (disambiguation)
- Georgiana
