= Frequency =

Number of occurrences or cycles per unit time

- A pendulum making 25 complete oscillations in 60 s, a frequency of 0.416̅ Hz
- Common symbols: f, ν
- SI unit: hertz (Hz)
- Other units: cycle per second (cps); revolution per minute (rpm or r/min)
- In SI base units: s^{−1}
- Derivations from other quantities: f = 1 / T
- Dimension: $\mathsf{T}^{-1}$

Frequency is the number of occurrences of a repeating event per unit of time. Frequency is an important parameter used in science and engineering to specify the rate of oscillatory and vibratory phenomena, such as mechanical vibrations, audio signals (sound), radio waves, and light.

The interval of time between events is called the period. It is the reciprocal of the frequency. For example, if a heart beats at a frequency of 120 times per minute (2 hertz), its period is one half of a second.

Special definitions of frequency are used in certain contexts, such as the angular frequency in rotational or cyclical properties, when the rate of angular progress is measured. Spatial frequency is defined for properties that vary or occur repeatedly in geometry or space.

The unit of measurement of frequency in the International System of Units (SI) is the hertz, having the symbol Hz.

== Definitions and units ==
A pendulum with a period of 2.8 s and a frequency of 0.36 Hz

For cyclical phenomena such as oscillations, waves, or for examples of simple harmonic motion, the term frequency is defined as the number of cycles or repetitions per unit of time. The conventional symbol for frequency is f or ν (the Greek letter nu) is also used. The period T is the time taken to complete one cycle of an oscillation or rotation. The frequency and the period are related by the equation

$$f = \frac{1}{T}.$$

The term temporal frequency is used to emphasise that the frequency is characterised by the number of occurrences of a repeating event per unit time.

The SI unit of frequency is the hertz (Hz), named after the German physicist Heinrich Hertz by the International Electrotechnical Commission in 1930. It was adopted by the CGPM (Conférence générale des poids et mesures) in 1960, officially replacing the previous name, cycle per second (cps). The SI unit for the period, as for all measurements of time, is the second. A traditional unit of frequency used with rotating mechanical devices, where it is termed rotational frequency, is revolution per minute, abbreviated r/min or rpm. Sixty rpm is equivalent to one hertz.

== Period versus frequency ==
As a matter of convenience, longer and slower waves, such as ocean surface waves, are more typically described by wave period rather than frequency. Short and fast waves, like audio and radio, are usually described by their frequency. Some commonly used conversions are listed below:

| Frequency | Period |
|---|---|
| 1 mHz (10^{−3} Hz) | 1 ks (10^{3} s) |
| 1 Hz (10^{0} Hz) | 1 s (10^{0} s) |
| 1 kHz (10^{3} Hz) | 1 ms (10^{−3} s) |
| 1 MHz (10^{6} Hz) | 1 μs (10^{−6} s) |
| 1 GHz (10^{9} Hz) | 1 ns (10^{−9} s) |
| 1 THz (10^{12} Hz) | 1 ps (10^{−12} s) |

== Related quantities ==
Diagram of the relationship between the different types of frequency and other wave properties. In this diagram, x is the input to the function represented by the arrow.

- Rotational frequency, usually denoted by the Greek letter ν (nu), is defined as the instantaneous rate of change of the number of rotations, N, with respect to time: ν = dN/dt; it is a type of frequency applied to rotational motion.
- Angular frequency, usually denoted by the Greek letter ω (omega), is defined as the rate of change of angular displacement (during rotation), θ (theta), or the rate of change of the phase of a sinusoidal waveform (notably in oscillations and waves), or as the rate of change of the argument to the sine function:
  $$y(t) = \sin \theta(t)  =  \sin(\omega t) =  \sin(2 \mathrm{\pi} f t)$$
  $$\frac{\mathrm{d} \theta}{\mathrm{d} t} = \omega = 2 \mathrm{\pi} f.$$
  The unit of angular frequency is the radian per second (rad/s) but, for discrete-time signals, can also be expressed as radians per sampling interval, which is a dimensionless quantity. Angular frequency is frequency multiplied by 2π.
- Spatial frequency, denoted here by ξ (xi), is analogous to temporal frequency, but with a spatial measurement replacing time measurement, e.g.:
  $$y(t) = \sin \theta(t,x) = \sin(\omega t + kx)$$
  $$\frac{\mathrm{d} \theta}{\mathrm{d} x} = k = 2 \pi \xi.$$
  - Spatial period or wavelength is the spatial analog to temporal period.

== In wave propagation ==
For periodic waves in nondispersive media (that is, media in which the wave speed is independent of frequency), frequency has an inverse relationship to the wavelength, λ (lambda). Even in dispersive media, the frequency f of a sinusoidal wave is equal to the phase velocity v of the wave divided by the wavelength λ of the wave:

$$f = \frac{v}{\lambda}.$$

In the special case of electromagnetic waves in vacuum, then v = c, where c is the speed of light in vacuum, and this expression becomes
$$f = \frac{c}{\lambda}.$$

When monochromatic waves travel from one medium to another, their frequency remains the same—only their wavelength and speed change.

== Measurement ==
Measurement of frequency can be done in the following ways:

=== Counting ===
Calculating the frequency of a repeating event is accomplished by counting the number of times that event occurs within a specific time period, then dividing the count by the period. For example, if 71 events occur within 15 seconds the frequency is:

$$f = \frac{71}{15 \,\text{s}} \approx 4.73 \, \text{Hz}.$$

If the number of counts is not very large, it is more accurate to measure the time interval for a predetermined number of occurrences, rather than the number of occurrences within a specified time. The latter method introduces a random error into the count of between zero and one count, so on average half a count. This is called gating error and causes an average error in the calculated frequency of $\Delta f = \frac{1}{2T_\text{m}}$, or a fractional error of $\frac{\Delta f}{f} = \frac{1}{2 f T_\text{m}}$ where $T_\text{m}$ is the timing interval and $f$ is the measured frequency. This error decreases with frequency, so it is generally a problem at low frequencies where the number of counts N is small.

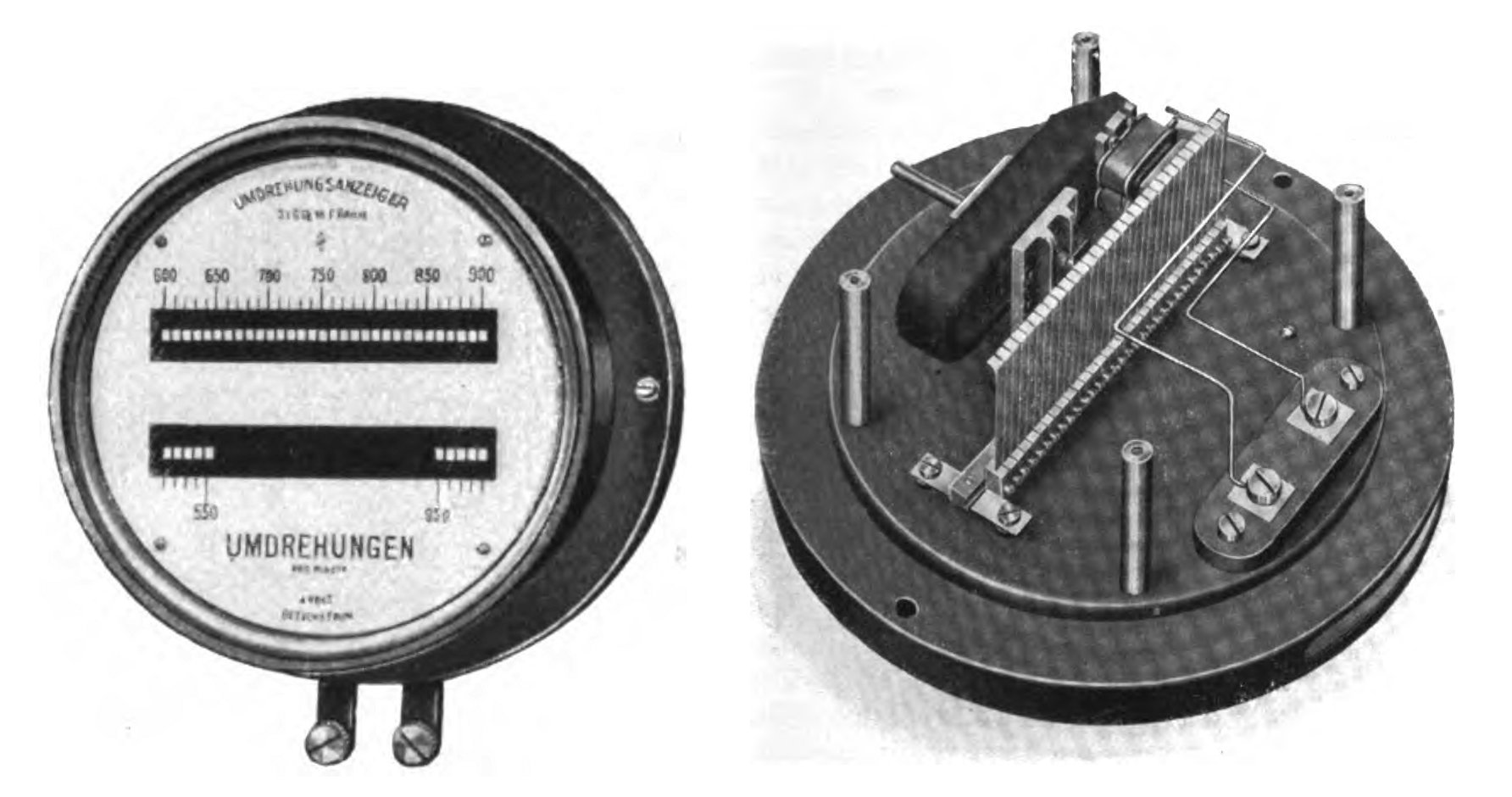
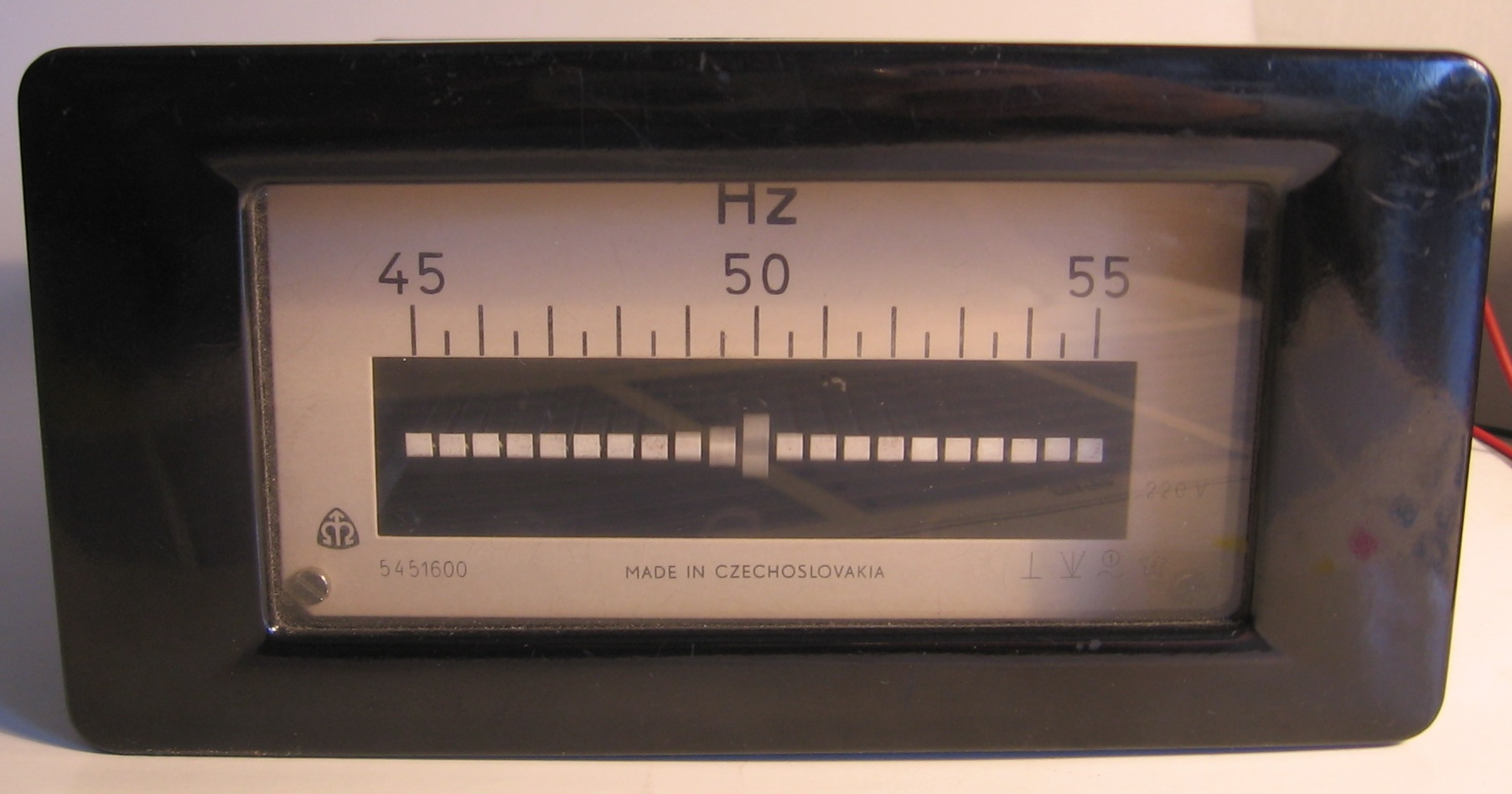
A resonant-reed frequency meter, an obsolete device used from about 1900 to the 1940s for measuring the frequency of alternating current. It consists of a strip of metal with reeds of graduated lengths, vibrated by an electromagnet. When the unknown frequency is applied to the electromagnet, the reed which is resonant at that frequency will vibrate with large amplitude, visible next to the scale.

=== Stroboscope ===
An old method of measuring the frequency of rotating or vibrating objects is to use a stroboscope. This is an intense repetitively flashing light (strobe light) whose frequency can be adjusted with a calibrated timing circuit. The strobe light is pointed at the rotating object and the frequency adjusted up and down. When the frequency of the strobe equals the frequency of the rotating or vibrating object, the object completes one cycle of oscillation and returns to its original position between the flashes of light, so when illuminated by the strobe the object appears stationary. Then the frequency can be read from the calibrated readout on the stroboscope. A downside of this method is that an object rotating at an integer multiple of the strobing frequency will also appear stationary.

=== Frequency counter ===
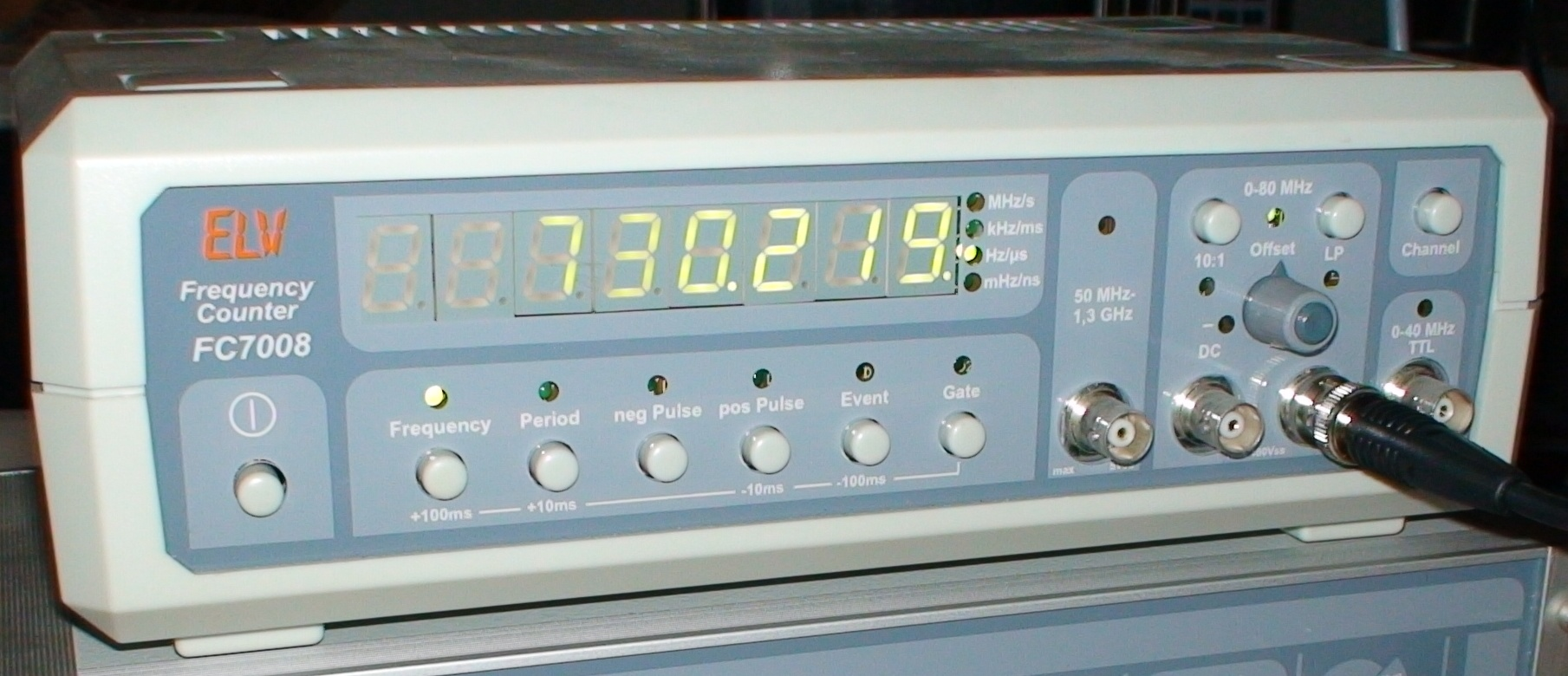
Modern frequency counter

Higher frequencies are usually measured with a frequency counter. This is an electronic instrument which measures the frequency of an applied repetitive electronic signal and displays the result in hertz on a digital display. It uses digital logic to count the number of cycles during a time interval established by a precision quartz time base. Cyclic processes that are not electrical, such as the rotation rate of a shaft, mechanical vibrations, or sound waves, can be converted to a repetitive electronic signal by transducers and the signal applied to a frequency counter. As of 2018, frequency counters can cover the range up to about 100 GHz. This represents the limit of direct counting methods; frequencies above this must be measured by indirect methods.

=== Heterodyne methods ===
Above the range of frequency counters, frequencies of electromagnetic signals are often measured indirectly utilizing heterodyning (frequency conversion). A reference signal of a known frequency near the unknown frequency is mixed with the unknown frequency in a nonlinear mixing device such as a diode. This creates a heterodyne or "beat" signal at the difference between the two frequencies. If the two signals are close together in frequency the heterodyne is low enough to be measured by a frequency counter. This process only measures the difference between the unknown frequency and the reference frequency. To convert higher frequencies, several stages of heterodyning can be used. Current research is extending this method to infrared and light frequencies (optical heterodyne detection).

== Examples ==
=== Light ===
Complete spectrum of electromagnetic radiation with the visible portion highlighted

Visible light is an electromagnetic wave, consisting of oscillating electric and magnetic fields traveling through space. The frequency of the wave determines its color: 400 THz (4×10^{14} Hz) is red light, 800 THz (8×10^{14} Hz) is violet light, and between these (in the range 400–800 THz) are all the other colors of the visible spectrum. An electromagnetic wave with a frequency less than 4×10^{14} Hz will be invisible to the human eye; such waves are called infrared (IR) radiation. At even lower frequency, the wave is called a microwave, and at still lower frequencies it is called a radio wave. Likewise, an electromagnetic wave with a frequency higher than 8×10^{14} Hz will also be invisible to the human eye; such waves are called ultraviolet (UV) radiation. Even higher-frequency waves are called X-rays, and higher still are gamma rays.

All of these waves, from the lowest-frequency radio waves to the highest-frequency gamma rays, are fundamentally the same, and they are all called electromagnetic radiation. They all travel through vacuum at the same speed (the speed of light), giving them wavelengths inversely proportional to their frequencies.

$$\displaystyle c=f\lambda,$$

where c is the speed of light (c in vacuum or less in other media), f is the frequency and λ is the wavelength.

In dispersive media, such as glass, the speed depends somewhat on frequency, so the wavelength is not quite inversely proportional to frequency.

=== Sound ===
The sound wave spectrum, with rough guide of some applications

Sound propagates as mechanical vibration waves of pressure and displacement, in air or other substances. In general, frequency components of a sound determine its "color", its timbre. When speaking about the frequency (in singular) of a sound, it means the property that most determines its pitch.

The frequencies an ear can hear are limited to a specific range of frequencies. The audible frequency range for humans is typically given as being between about 20 Hz and 20,000 Hz (20 kHz), though the high frequency limit usually reduces with age. Other species have different hearing ranges. For example, some dog breeds can perceive vibrations up to 60,000 Hz.

In many media, such as air, the speed of sound is approximately independent of frequency, so the wavelength of the sound waves (distance between repetitions) is approximately inversely proportional to frequency.

=== Line current ===
In Europe, Africa, Australia, southern South America, most of Asia, and Russia, the frequency of the alternating current in household electrical outlets is 50 Hz (close to the tone G), whereas in North America and northern South America, the frequency of the alternating current in household electrical outlets is 60 Hz (between the tones B♭ and B; that is, a minor third above the European frequency). The frequency of the 'hum' in an audio recording can show in which of these general regions the recording was made.

== Aperiodic frequency ==
Aperiodic frequency is the rate of incidence or occurrence of non-cyclic phenomena, including random processes such as radioactive decay. It is expressed with the unit reciprocal second (s^{−1}) or, in the case of radioactivity, with the unit becquerel.

It is formulated as a quotient,
$$f = \frac{N}{\Delta t}$$
involving the number of entities counted or the number of events happened (N) during a given time duration (Δt); it is a physical quantity of type temporal rate.

== See also ==
- Audio frequency
- Bandwidth (signal processing)
- Chirp
- Cutoff frequency
- Downsampling
- Electronic filter
- Fourier analysis
- Frequency band
- Frequency converter
- Frequency domain
- Frequency distribution
- Frequency extender
- Frequency grid
- Frequency level
- Frequency modulation
- Frequency spectrum
- Interaction frequency
- Least-squares spectral analysis
- Natural frequency
- Negative frequency
- Periodicity (disambiguation)
- Pink noise
- Preselector
- Radar signal characteristics
- Radio frequency
- Signaling (telecommunications)
- Spread spectrum
- Spectral component
- Transverter
- Upsampling
- Orders of magnitude (frequency)

== Sources ==
- Davies, A. (1997). Handbook of Condition Monitoring: Techniques and Methodology. New York: Springer. ISBN 978-0-412-61320-3.
- Serway, Raymond A.; Faughn, Jerry S. (1989). College Physics. London: Thomson/Brooks-Cole. ISBN 978-05344-0-814-5.
- Young, Ian R. (1999). Wind Generated Ocean Waves. Elsevere Ocean Engineering. Vol. 2. Oxford: Elsevier. ISBN 978-0-08-043317-2.
