= Orders of magnitude (frequency) =

Comparison of a wide range of frequencies

The following list illustrates various frequencies, measured in hertz, according to decade in the order of their magnitudes, with the negative decades illustrated by events and positive decades by acoustic or electromagnetic uses.

Factor (Hz)	Multiple	Value	Item
10^{−18}	1 attohertz (aHz)	~2.2978 aHz	The Hubble constant (once in 13.8 billion years)
10^{−17}	10 aHz	~79 aHz	Supercontinent cycle (about every 400 million years)
10^{−16}	100 aHz	~137.8 aHz	Once per galactic year (about every 230 million years)
10^{−15}	1 femtohertz (fHz)	~3 fHz	Sound waves created by a supermassive black hole in the Perseus Cluster
10^{−14}	10 fHz	~31.71 fHz	Once every one million years
10^{−12}	1 picohertz (pHz)	1.23 pHz	Precession of the Earth's axis (about every 25,700 years)
10^{−11}	10 pHz	~31.71 pHz	Once per millennium
10^{−10}	100 pHz	~317.1 pHz	Once per century
10^{−9}	1 nanohertz (nHz)	~1 nHz	Once per generation (about every 30 years)
10^{−9}	1 nanohertz (nHz)	~2.9 nHz	Average solar cycle (about every 11 years)
10^{−9}	1 nanohertz (nHz)	~3.171 nHz	Once per decade
10^{−8}	10 nHz	11.6699016 nHz	Once in a blue moon
10^{−8}	10 nHz	~31.71 nHz	Yearly (or Earth's orbital frequency)
10^{−7}	100 nHz	~380.5 nHz	Monthly (or the Moon's orbital frequency)
10^{−7}	100 nHz	~413 nHz	Average menstrual cycle (28 days)
10^{−6}	1 microhertz (μHz)	~1.653 μHz	Weekly
10^{−5}	10 μHz	~11.57 μHz	Daily (or Earth's rotation frequency)
10^{−4}	100 μHz	~277.8 μHz	Hourly
10^{−2}	1 centihertz (cHz)	~16.667 mHz	One rpm
10^{−1}	1 decihertz (dHz)	189 mHz	Acoustic – frequency of G_{−7}, the lowest note sung by the singer with the deepest voice in the world, Tim Storms. His vocal cords vibrate 1 time every 5.29 seconds.
10^{0}	1 hertz (Hz)	1 to 1.66 Hz	Approximate frequency of an adult human's resting heart beat
10^{0}	1 hertz (Hz)	1 Hz	60 bpm, common tempo in music
10^{0}	1 hertz (Hz)	2 Hz	120 bpm, common tempo in music
10^{0}	1 hertz (Hz)	~7.83 Hz	Fundamental frequency of the Schumann resonances
10^{1}	10 hertz	10 Hz	Cyclic rate of a typical automobile engine at idle (equivalent to 600 rpm)
10^{1}	10 hertz	12 Hz	Acoustic – the lowest possible frequency that a human can hear
10^{1}	10 hertz	18 Hz	Average house cat's purr
10^{1}	10 hertz	24 Hz	Common frame rate of movies
10^{1}	10 hertz	27.5 Hz	Acoustic – the lowest musical note (A_{0}) playable on a normally-tuned standard piano
10^{1}	10 hertz	50 Hz	Electromagnetic – standard AC mains power (European AC, Tokyo AC), refresh rate of PAL and SECAM CRT televisions
10^{1}	10 hertz	60 Hz	Electromagnetic – standard AC mains power (American AC, Osaka AC), refresh rate of NTSC CRT televisions and standard refresh rate of computer monitors
10^{2}	100 Hz	100 Hz	Cyclic rate of a typical automobile engine at redline (equivalent to 6000 rpm)
10^{2}	100 Hz	261.626 Hz	Acoustic – the musical note middle C (C_{4})
10^{2}	100 Hz	440 Hz	Acoustic – concert pitch (A above middle C; A_{4}), used for tuning musical instruments
10^{2}	100 Hz	716 Hz	Rotational period of one of the fastest known millisecond pulsars, PSR J1748−2446ad
10^{3}	1 kilohertz (kHz)	1 kHz	Usual frequency of a bleep censor
10^{3}	1 kilohertz (kHz)	4.186 kHz	Acoustic – the highest musical note (C_{8}) playable on a normally-tuned standard piano
10^{3}	1 kilohertz (kHz)	8 kHz	ISDN sampling rate
10^{4}	10 kHz	14 kHz	Acoustic – the typical upper limit of adult human hearing
10^{4}	10 kHz	17.4 kHz	Acoustic – a frequency known as the Mosquito, which is generally only audible to those under the age of 24.
10^{4}	10 kHz	25.1 kHz	Acoustic – G_{10}, the highest pitch sung by Georgia Brown, who has a vocal range of 8 octaves.
10^{4}	10 kHz	44.1 kHz	Common audio sampling frequency
10^{5}	100 kHz	740 kHz	The clock speed of the world's first commercial microprocessor, the Intel 4004 (1971)
10^{6}	1 megahertz (MHz)	530 kHz to 1.710 MHz	Electromagnetic – AM radio broadcasts
10^{6}	1 megahertz (MHz)	1 MHz to 8 MHz	Clock speeds of early home/personal computers (mid-1970s to mid-1980s)
10^{7}	10 MHz	13.56 MHz	Electromagnetic – near-field communication
10^{8}	100 MHz	88 MHz to 108 MHz	Electromagnetic – FM radio broadcasts
10^{8}	100 MHz	902 to 928 MHz	Electromagnetic – common cordless telephone frequency in the US
10^{9}	1 gigahertz (GHz)	1.42 GHz	Electromagnetic – the hyperfine transition of hydrogen, also known as the hydrogen line or 21 cm line
10^{9}	1 gigahertz (GHz)	2.4 GHz	Electromagnetic – microwave ovens, wireless LANs and cordless phones (starting in 1998)
10^{9}	1 gigahertz (GHz)	2.6–3.8 GHz	A common desktop CPU speed as of 2014
10^{9}	1 gigahertz (GHz)	5.8 GHz	Electromagnetic – cordless telephone frequency introduced in 2003
10^{10}	10 GHz	3 GHz to 30 GHz	Electromagnetic – super high frequency
10^{10}	10 GHz	60 GHz	Electromagnetic – 60 GHz Wi-Fi (WiGig) introduced in 2010
10^{11}	100 GHz	160.2 GHz	Electromagnetic – peak of cosmic microwave background radiation
10^{11}	100 GHz	845 GHz	Fastest transistor (December 2006).
10^{12}	1 terahertz (THz)		The terahertz gap
10^{13}	10 THz	21 THz to 33 THz	Electromagnetic – infrared light used in thermal imaging, for example for night vision
10^{13}	10 THz	31.5 THz	Electromagnetic – peak of black-body radiation emitted by human body
10^{14}	100 THz	400 THz to 790 THz	Electromagnetic – visible light, from red to violet
10^{15}	1 petahertz (PHz)	2.47 PHz	Electromagnetic – Lyman-alpha line
10^{16}	10 PHz	30 PHz	Electromagnetic – X-rays
10^{17}	100 PHz		
10^{18}	1 exahertz (EHz)		
10^{19}	10 EHz		
10^{20}	100 EHz	300 EHz +	Electromagnetic – gamma rays
10^{21}	1 zettahertz (ZHz)	36 ZHz	Resonance width of the rho meson
10^{24}	1 yottahertz (YHz)		
10^{27}	1 ronnahertz (RHz)	3.9 RHz	Highest energy (16 TeV) gamma ray detected, from Markarian 501

== See also ==
- Orders of magnitude (rotational speed)
