= Name of Georgia =

Name of Georgia may refer to:

- Georgia (name), a given name
- Names of Georgia (country)
