= Georgiana =

- Gender: Female

Origin
- Meaning: Greek word Γεώργιος, meaning farmer.

Other names
- Variant form: Georgeanna
- Related names: George, Georgia, Georgina, Georgine

Georgiana is a Catalan, English, Greek, and Romanian name. It is a variation of the female names Georgina and Georgia. It comes from the Greek word Γεώργιος (Geórgios), meaning "farmer". A variant spelling is Georgianna.

== List of persons with the given name Georgiana ==
- Georgiana Astley (1796–1835), English daughter of Sir Henry Dashwood, MP
- Georgianna Behm, American politician
- Georgiana Blankenship (1861–1936), American writer
- Georgiana Bloomfield, Baroness Bloomfield (1822–1905), British courtier and author
- Georgiana Bonser (1898–1979), British physician
- Georgiana Buller (1884–1953), English hospital administrator
- Georgiana Burne-Jones (1840–1920), artist, wife and biographer of Edward Burne-Jones
- Georgiana Cavendish, Duchess of Devonshire (1757–1806)
- Georgiana Chatterton (1806–1876), English aristocrat, traveler, and author
- Georgiana Cholmondeley, Marchioness of Cholmondeley, (1764–1838)
- Lady Georgiana Curzon (1910–1976), English socialite
- Georgiana Fanny Shipley Daniell (1836–1894), British philanthropist
- Georgiana Drew (1856–1893), American actress and comedian, a member of the Barrymore acting family
- Georgiana Dvorak-Theobald (1884–1971), American ophthalmologist
- Lady Georgiana Fullerton (1812–1885), English novelist, philanthropist, and biographer
- Georgiana Harcourt (1807–1886), writer and translator
- Georgiana Finch-Hatton, Countess of Winchilsea, (1791–1835)
- Georgiana Hill (1858–1924), British social historian and women's rights activist
- Georgiana Klingle Holmes (1841–1940), American poet and painter
- Georgiana Houghton (1814–1884), British artist and spiritualist medium
- Georgiana Burne-Jones (1840–1920), British painter and engraver
- Georgiana Keate (1771 (probably)–1850), English painter
- Georgiana Goddard King (1871–1939), American Hispanist and medievalist
- Georgiana Leicester, Baroness de Tabley (1794–1859), English aristocrat
- Georgiana Lobonț (born 1994), Romanian singer
- Georgiana McCrae (1804–1890), English-Australian painter and diarist
- Georgiana Molloy (1805–1843), English-Australian botanical collector
- Georgiana Hare-Naylor (1755–1806), English painter and art patron
- Georgiana Rolls, Baroness Llangattock (c.1837–1923), socialite and enthusiast for Nelson
- Georgiana Russell, Duchess of Bedford (1781–1853), British aristocrat and patron of the arts
- Georgiana Seymour, Duchess of Somerset (1809–1884)
- Georgiana Simpson (1865–1944), African-American philologist
- Georgiana Solomon (1844–1933), British educator and campaigner
- Georgiana Somerset, Marchioness of Worcester (1792–1821)
- Georgiana Spencer, Countess Spencer (1737–1814), English philanthropist
- Georgiana Teodorescu (born 1985), Romanian politician
- Georgiana Young (1924–2007), American actress
- Georgiana Zornlin (1800–1881), English artist and writer

== Fictional characters ==
- Georgiana Darcy, younger sister of one of the main characters in Pride and Prejudice
- Georgiana Pirrip, the mother of Pip in Charles Dickens's "Great Expectations"
- Georgiana, wife of Aylmer in Nathaniel Hawthorne's "The Birthmark"
- Georgiana Reed, cousin of Jane Eyre in Charlotte Brontë's novel of the same name.

== Dramatic works ==
- Georgiana (2019), an opera pasticcio based on the life of Georgiana Cavendish, Duchess of Devonshire (1757–1806) commissioned by the Buxton Festival.

== Territories ==
- Georgiana, a colony proposed by Phineas Lyman for establishment in the Natchez district of British West Florida.

== List of persons with the given name Georgianna ==
- Georgianna Bell, a pen name of the author Anne Rundle
- Georgianna Bishop (1878–1971), American golfer
- Georgianna Hiliadaki, Greek chef
- Georgianna Hopley (1858–1944), better known as Georgia Hopley, American journalist and temperance advocate
- Georgianna Lincoln (born 1943), American politician and businesswoman
- Georgianna Robertson (born 1972), Jamaican model and actress
- Georgianna Stout (born 1967), American graphic designer
- Georgianna Kathleen Symonette (1902–1965), Bahamian suffragist
