= Frequency extender =

Electronic device used in telephone systems

In broadcast engineering, a frequency extender is an electronic device that expands the usable frequency range of POTS telephone lines. It also allows high-fidelity analog audio to be sent over regular telephone lines, without the loss of lower audio frequencies (bass). It is an extended concept of a telephone hybrid.

The concept uses frequency shifting to overcome the narrow bandwidth of regular telephone systems, extending the usable range by approximately two octaves. The input signal is sent on one telephone line as-is, or in some cases upshifted to provide extra low-frequency response, and sent on a second line shifted down by 3 kHz, which is normally the upper bandpass limit in telephony. Thus, an audio frequency of 5 kHz is sent at 2 kHz. A receiver on the other end then shifts the second line back up and mixes it with the first. This results in greatly improved audio, adding a full octave of range, and pushing the total bandpass to 6 kHz. The sound is then acceptable for voice, if not for music.

It is also possible to add other lines, each increasing the bandpass by another 3 kHz. However, the law of diminishing returns takes over, because each successive octave is double the size of the last. A third line pushes the bandpass up 50% to 9 kHz, equivalent to AM radio. A fourth line would push it up 33% to 12 kHz. FM radio quality would require five telephone lines to be installed, pushing the bandpass up 25% to 15 kHz. The audio is shifted down by 6,9, and 12 kHz respectively for each additional line.

Frequency extenders have been nearly eliminated by POTS codecs.

== See also ==
- Remote broadcast
