= Airchain =

Route of audiovisual signals

In broadcast engineering for radio or television, the airchain or transmission chain (UK) (sometimes air chain (US) or just chain (UK)) is the path or route an audio or video signal takes on its way through a radio station or television station.

The airchain begins with cameras, microphones, CD players, turntables, telephone hybrids, video tape recorders, satellite and other remote feeds, and other input devices in the studio and control room. These feed into a mixing console, possibly via a router. The output then goes to an audio processor, and finally to the transmitter, feedline, and antenna. Often, there is a studio-transmitter link via radio or broadband dedicated circuit (usually T1 or E1 line).

The airchain may be all-analogue, all-digital, or most likely some hybrid of the two.

All-analog airchains typically use cables terminated in XLR connectors between each device. All-digital airchains also often use XLR connectors, except carrying AES/EBU digital audio instead. Alternatively, some digital airchains have significant portions of audio carried over TCP/IP, in which case Ethernet is used.
