= Comrex =

American technology corporation

Comrex Corporation
- Company type: Private (employee-owned)
- Industry: Broadcasting
- Founded: 1961; 64 years ago
- Founder: John Cheney
- Headquarters: Devens, Massachusetts, United States
- Key people: Tom Hartnett, Kris Bobo Specht (directors)
- Website: comrex.com

Comrex is an American corporation that designs and manufactures equipment for radio and television broadcasting.

== Beginnings ==
Comrex was founded in 1961 by John Cheney, a broadcast engineer. His mission, as outlined in Comrex's inaugural press release, is "to apply advanced state of the art knowledge and techniques to the production of high quality, practical equipment which can be operated by non-technical personnel.”

Throughout the 1960s and 1970s, Comrex developed audio products for the television market. In 1968, founder John Cheney developed Models 7035 and 7040 receivers for wireless microphone systems. In 1973, the 450 RA/TA wireless microphone system, designed for TV news, is the first to enable reporters to move more than 1000 feet from the camera. In 1975, The Comrex wireless cue system, composed of the CTA cue transmitter and the CRA (now LPQRA) receiver, enables field reporters and producers to hear production audio and instructions, without a wired connection to a news van.

== POTS Technology ==
From the late 1970s onward, Comrex began building products for remote radio broadcasters:

- 1978 – The Frequency Extender, including the PLX and TLX transmitters, and RLX receivers, and 2F transmitter-receiver, allow broadcasters to send audio with bass over one plain old telephone (POTS) line by frequency-shifting program audio 250 Hz. Frequency Extenders become popular with remote broadcasters and news reporters.
- 1983 – The two-line Frequency Extender (PTLX and RTLX) is introduced. These units transmit 5 kHz over two lines and utilize a five-band compounding system for noise reduction.
- 1985 – The STLX Sports Console incorporates additional features into the two-line Frequency Extender, specifically for sportscasters.
- 1987 – The PLXMicro repackages the Frequency Extender into a portable case, compatible with cellphones.
- 1989 – The 2XP and 2XR two-line Frequency Extenders are introduced.
- 1990 – The 3XP and 3XR are introduced – these carry 8 kHz audio, split into three parts and shifted onto three lines.
- 1997 – The Hotline POTS codec is developed. Capable of sending bidirectional 10 kHz audio on one phone line, it becomes a standard for POTS broadcasting.
- 1998 – The Vector is backward compatible with the Comrex Hotline, and has a frequency response of 15 kHz.

== ISDN Codecs ==
From 1991 to 2000, Comrex released a series of ISDN codecs.

- 1991 – Comrex introduces its first digital codec, the DXP and DXR. Each is used with a terminal adapter to send and receive bidirectional 7.5 kHz audio with virtually no delay.
- 1996 – The Nexus is introduced. An ISDN codec with a terminal adapter housed in a case smaller than a shoebox, combined with easy menus, make this unit popular with non-technical users.
- 2000 – The Matrix is developed. An ISDN codec, the Matrix also includes optional modules which enable it to function on a variety of circuits, including future networks which will be implemented years later.

== Hybrids ==
- 1988 – Comrex introduces the TH-X, a hybrid that includes an extender.
- 2002 – Comrex acquires Gentner's digital hybrid line.
- 2004 – The STAC talk show management system is introduced.
- 2012 – The STAC VIP is developed – building off of the features of STAC, STAC VIP works on IP phone systems.
- 2016 – Comrex develops the VH2, a two-line VoIP hybrid.

== ACCESS and BRIC-Link Technology ==
In 2006, Cheney's technical successor Tom Hartnett, in partnership with company co-director Kristine Bobo Specht, developed BRIC (Broadcast Reliable Internet Codec) technology. A full-featured suite of tools, BRIC incorporated sophisticated jitter buffers and proprietary algorithms to provide better quality audio over inherently unstable networks, like the public internet.

With BRIC in place, Comrex released the ACCESS codec in 2006. ACCESS was distinguished from its competitors by the hand-held design of the portable unit. Due to this form factor, and to the variety of networks on which it could function, ACCESS did not require the stationary set-up of the codecs that preceded it.

BRIC technology was also used to develop the BRIC-Link. An IP codec, BRIC-Link was intended for use as an STL or in other point-to-point applications. Since its introduction in 2009, it has been used widely in both radio and television by many organizations, including the NBA.

In 2015, the BRIC-Link II, an updated version of the BRIC-Link, was introduced.

In 2023, Comrex introduced BRIC-Link III at the NAB 2022 show. BRIC-Link III has CrossLock VPN technology.

== LiveShot ==
In 2012, Comrex adapted BRIC technology to transport video as well as audio. The resulting product, named LiveShot, could send video and audio bidirectionally over IP networks (including Wi-Fi and 3G/4G), with less than 500 milliseconds of delay. Weighing only 3 pounds, LiveShot was designed for news crews and ENG reporters who needed lightweight equipment.

In the years that followed, LiveShot was updated with CrossLock technology, a method of network bonding in which a VPN is established between the transmitting and receiving units. CrossLock greatly improved LiveShot's broadcasting reliability, especially over unstable IP networks. LiveShot's price-point, along with its versatility, have made it popular with small stations, educational organizations, and government facilities.
