= Jorja =

Jorja is a feminine given name related to Georgia which may refer to:

- Jorja Chalmers, Australian saxophone and keyboard player
- Jorja Douglas, winner of Got What It Takes? (series 2), a British children's talent show and member of Flo
- Jorja Fleezanis, American violinist
- Jorja Fox (born 1968), American actress and producer
- Jorja Johnson, American professional pickleball player
- Jorja Leap, American anthropologist, author, and social worker
- Jorja Monatella, a character in the Dean Koontz novel Strangers
- Jorja Smith (born 1997), English singer-songwriter

== See also ==
- Jorgjia Filçe-Truja (1907–1994), Albanian soprano
