= Jorge Trías =

Spanish lawyer and politician (1948–2022)

Member of the Congress of Deputies
- In office 13 March 1996 – 5 April 2000
- Constituency: Barcelona

Personal details
- Born: Jorge Trías Sagnier; 13 July 1948 Barcelona, Spain
- Died: 13 April 2022 (aged 73) Barcelona, Spain
- Party: PP
- Education: University of Barcelona
- Occupation: Lawyer

Jorge Trías Sagnier (13 July 1948 – 13 April 2022) was a Spanish politician.

== Biography ==
A member of the People's Party, he served in the Congress of Deputies from 1996 to 2000. He was known as the whistleblower in the Bárcenas affair, exposing corruption within the People's Party. Trías died in Barcelona on 13 April 2022, at the age of 73, due to the after-effects of a COVID-19 infection, from which he had recovered a few weeks earlier.

His daughter is the Vox party politician Georgina Trías Gil.
