= Georgina Montagu =

British journalist and author

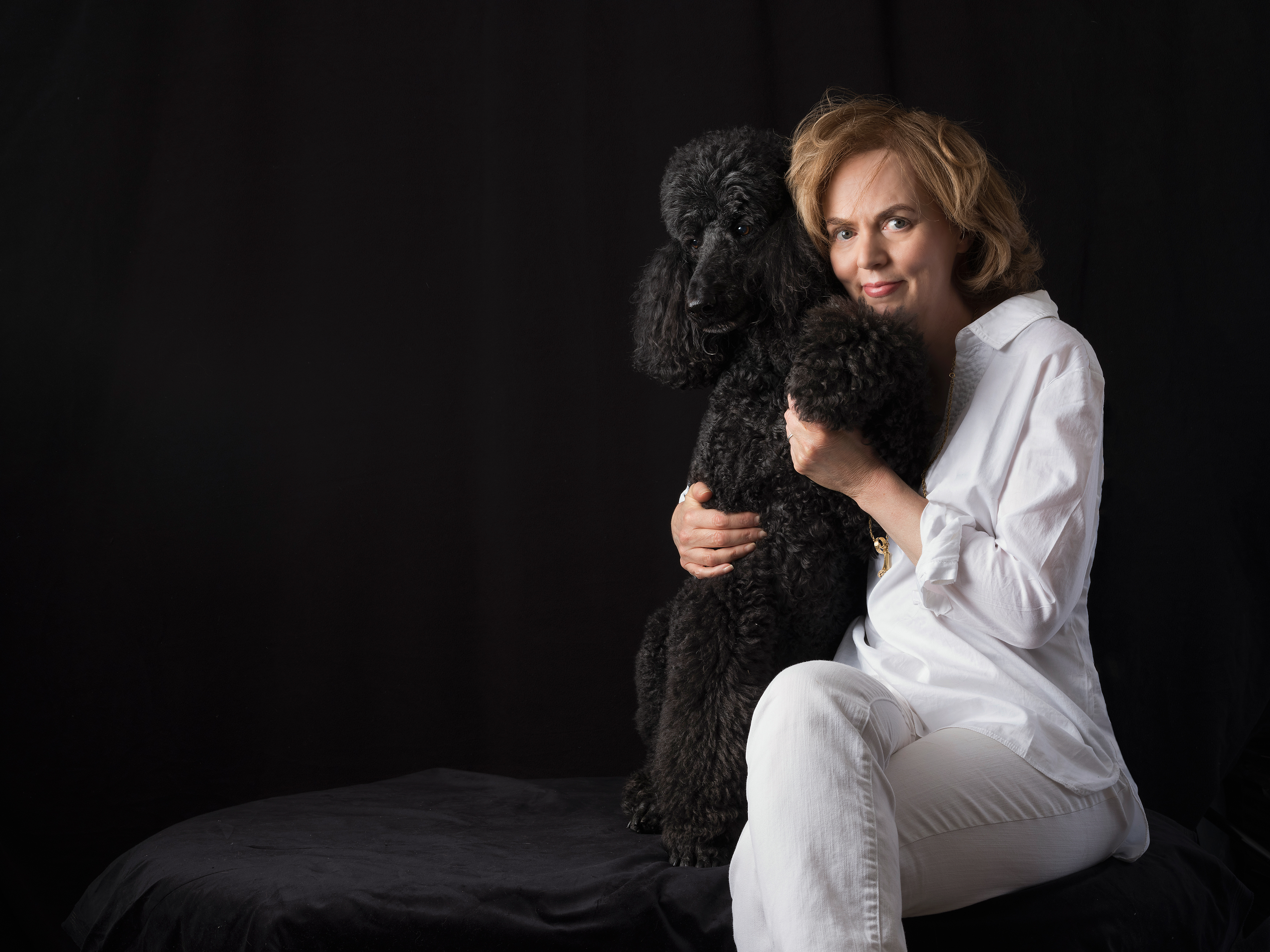
Georgina Montagu sitting with her previous standard poodle Albert

Georgina Montagu is a British journalist and author. In 2022, she wrote Top Dogs: A British Love Affair.

Top Dogs has a foreword from Queen Camilla (and pictures of her rescue terriers), and interviews with subjects including Andrew Lloyd Webber, Camilla Lowther and her partner Charles Aboah, Carole Bamford, the Irish Guards, Jasper Conran, John Pawson, Philip Mould and the Duke of Richmond, along with photos of their dogs.

Montagu is the great-granddaughter of English collector and philanthropist Nellie Ionides who, at her home in Sussex, Buxted Park, had kennels for more than 100 standard poodles, and ran a school for kennel maids.

She has lived in London, Tokyo, Paris and San Francisco, and worked for The Sunday Times Magazine and The World of Interiors, among others.

Montagu has two daughters and a standard poodle, Rollo, and lives in London .

== Publications ==
- Top Dogs: A British Love Affair, Triglyph, 2022
