= Georgia May Jobson =

American temperance reformer (1860–1924)

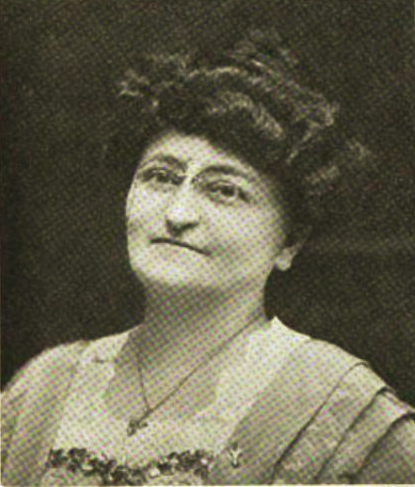
Portrait photo from Standard Encyclopedia of the Alcohol Problem (1926)

Georgia May Jobson (December 29, 1860 – December 24, 1924) was an American temperance reformer. She served as President of the Richmond-Henrico County Woman's Christian Temperance Union (WCTU) (1903–1910), before becoming the first President of the Woman's Prohibition League of America (1910–1924).

== Early life and education ==
Georgia May Spence was born on December 29, 1860, in Richmond, Virginia. Her parents were George A Spence (1831–1865) and Mildred Virginia (Brown) (1836–1892). Georgia's siblings were Walter, Carrie and Kate. Jobson was educated in the public schools of her native city.

== Career ==
Throughout her life, Jobson was actively identified with the temperance movement. She was the first leader of a Band of Hope, organized in Richmond, and early affiliated herself with a number of the larger temperance organizations of the U.S. When the first branch of the WCTU was formed in the State of Virginia (October 1881), Jobson became one of its members. In March, 1887, she was elected president of the first Young WCTU (YWCTU) to be organized south of Washington, D.C., and in 1894, she was chosen State secretary of the Virginia YWCTU. Later in that same year, she was elected president of the Richmond District YWCTU. Four years later, she was appointed national secretary for the “White Shield” work (Social Purity) of the National WCTU. In December 1910, she was elected first president of the Woman's Prohibition League of America, which position she held continuously until her death. The success which the Prohibition cause met in Virginia was in large measure due to the efforts of Jobson, a pioneer in the women's temperance movement.

At the Sixteenth National Convention of the Anti-Saloon League of America, held at Atlantic City, New Jersey, July 6–9, 1915, Jobson delivered to the assembled delegates "A Message from the Southland" in which address she described the origin and growth of the temperance movement in Virginia from the foundation of the first temperance society in the State, in 1823, down to 1915.

== Personal life ==
On November 10, 1880, she married Joseph Tyler Jobson (1841–1927), also of Richmond.

Jobson died on December 24, 1924, in Richmond, Virginia. She was buried in Hollywood Cemetery.
