= Georgia Makhlouf =

Lebanese writer and literary critic

- جورجيا مخلوف
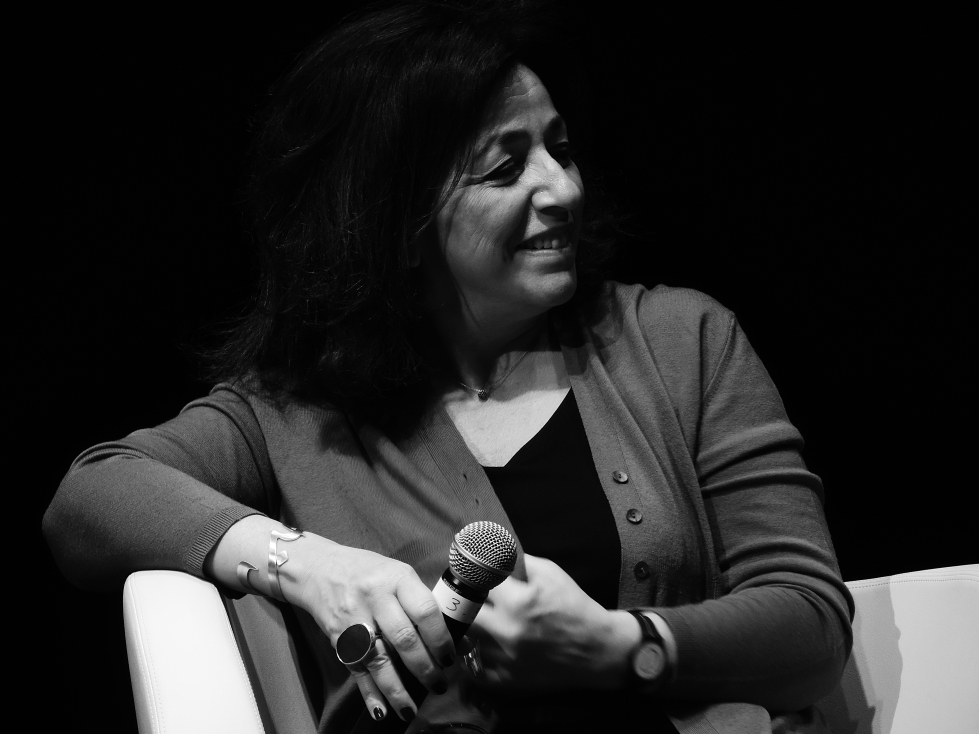
- Georgia Makhlouf at Escapades littéraires, 2016
- Writing career
- Language: French
- Notable work: Les absents (2014)
- Notable awards: Prix Léopold Sedar Senghor (2014)

Georgia Makhlouf (Arabic: جورجيا مخلوف) is a Lebanese writer in the French language, an editor and literary critic. She is a winner of the Prix Léopold Sedar Senghor and the Prix Ulysse.

== Life and career ==
Georgia Makhlouf was born in Lebanon. At the age of 20, during the Lebanese civil war, she left for Paris. At university, she worked on a thesis focussing on ideology in modern Lebanese children's literature.

Makhlouf is an editor of L'Orient littéraire as well as a contributor to the literary supplement of the Lebanese daily L'Orient-Le Jour. She also writes interviews and articles for Huffington Post.

In 2014, Makhlouf published her first novel, Les absents. This was awarded the ninth Léopold Sedar Senghor prize for debut novel. It also won the Prix Ulysse of the Arte Mare festival.

Makhlouf founded Kitabat, an association to promote writing workshops in Lebanon. She lives in Paris.

== Selected works ==
- Éclats de mémoire, Beyrouth, fragments d’enfance. Al Manar. 2005. ISBN 978-2913896352. (France-Liban prize)
- Les Hommes debout : dialogue avec les Phéniciens. Al Manar. 2007. ISBN 978-2913896505. (Phénix prize)
- Les Absents. Rivages. 2014. ISBN 978-2743626877. (Léopold Sedar Senghor prize)
- Le Goût de l’Orient. Mercure de France. 2014. ISBN 978-2715234383.
- Le Goût de la liberté. Mercure de France. 2016. ISBN 978-2715241541.
