= Georgina Trías Gil =

Spanish politician

Georgina Trías Gil MP

Member of the Congress of Deputies
- Incumbent
- Assumed office 10 November 2019
- Constituency: Ávila

Personal details
- Born: 14 July 1973 (age 53) Barcelona, Spain
- Party: Vox
- Children: 6
- Education: University of Barcelona; New York University

Georgina Trías Gil (born 14 July 1973 in Barcelona) is a Spanish politician for the Vox party and a member of the Congress of Deputies for the Ávila constituency.

Gil is the daughter of poet, author and former People's Party politician Jorge Trías who was known for uncovering the Bárcenas affair. She grew up in Barcelona and attended the University of Barcelona where she completed a degree in Hispanic studies before studying literature at New York University in the United States. She speaks five languages, including Spanish, English, French and Italian. Gil is also married and is the mother of six children.

During the Spanish general election of April 2019, Gil stood as the leading Vox candidate for the Ávila constituency but narrowly failed to get elected. She was re-selected to compete for the constituency in November 2019 and was successful at winning a seat in the 14th Cortes Generales. In 2020, she took part in a motorcade demonstrations in response to the handling of the COVID-19 pandemic by the Spanish government.
