= Georgiana Lobonț =

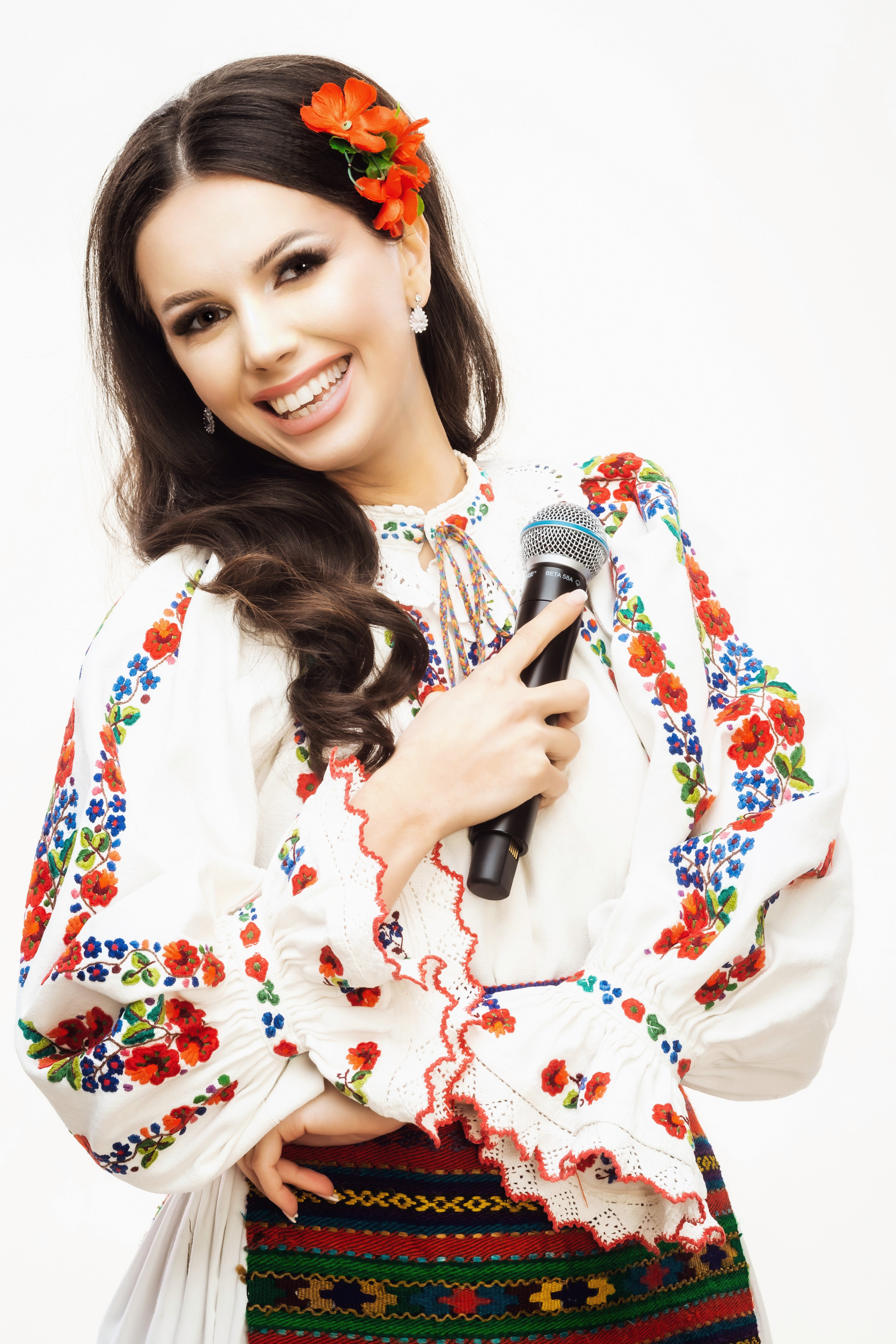
- Lobonț in 2020

Background information
- Birth name: Georgiana Maria Lobonț
- Born: 9 April 1994 (age 31); Gherla, Cluj County, Romania
- Genres: Pop, folk
- Occupation: Singer

Georgiana Maria Lobonț (born 9 April 1994) is a Romanian singer.

== Life and career ==
Lobonț was born on 9 April 1994 in Gherla, Cluj County. She began singing at the age of 4 and first performed in the children's competition "Tip Top Mini Top". She graduated from the folk art school "Tudor Jarda" in Cluj-Napoca with a focus on folk singing. In 2016, she also completed a law degree at Babeș-Bolyai University.

Lobonț made her official debut in 2005 in the television show "Tezaur Folcloric". In 2010, she released her first folk music album entitled "Mi-o spus frunza fagului". Her big breakthrough came in 2017 with the album "Vin nuntașii după mine", which included the successful songs "Bârgăuanul" and "Jupâneasa".

== Personal life ==
Since 2016, Lobonț has been married to Rareș Ciciovan, who also acts as her manager. The couple have two children. Ciciovan gave up his career as a dentist to devote himself entirely to his wife's management.

== Discography ==
=== Studio albums ===
- 2020: Tot Merea Petrea Prin Rai
- 2021: 4 nopti si 4 zile e chef mare
- 2021: De Cand Mama M-a Facut
- 2022: Colinde si Cantece de Craciun
- 2022: Pricesne

=== Singles ===
- 2021: Ciocolata (with Baboiash and Culita Sterp)
- 2022: Numele Tau
- 2023: Banii Din Intreaga Lume (with Lavinia Maris)
- 2023: Soari (with Jorge)
- 2023: Intre Doua Nu Te Ploua (with Andreea Bănică)
- 2023: Am realizat in toti anii (with Jador and Culita Sterp)
- 2024: Toată România (Party FTZ)" (with Costi, Bogdan DLP, Baboiash, Maria Dragomiroiu, Paul Stanga & Vali Vijelie)
- 2024: Tanar De-as Mai Fi (with Florin Peste)
