= Georgianna Hiliadaki =

Greek chef and restaurateur

- Born: Athens, Greece
- Education: University of Reading; Institute of Culinary Education
- Occupations: Chef, Restaurateur

Georgianna Hiliadaki is a Greek Michelin star chef and restaurateur, owner of the Funky Gourmet restaurant. Along with her partner, Nikos Roussos, have been called “the Greek power duo” who are the executive chefs and cofounders of Hospitality Group Modern Greek Food Group (MGFG). The Funky Gourmet in Athens, Greece is their flagship restaurant and has 2 Michelin Stars. It was founded in 2009. They met when they attended the Institute of Culinary Education in New York City and graduated in 2003.

In June 2014, along with Alex and Andreas Labridis, they opened OPSO Restaurant in London. Beginning in 2016, OPSO has been listed by the Michelin Guide as a “good plate” restaurant and since 2018, one of the 100 Best Restaurants in the UK by OpenTable.

== Biography ==
Hiliadaki was born in Athens. At the University of Reading, she studied European Relations and Italian. She continued on to ICE, earning degrees in culinary arts and restaurant management. In 2009, Georgianna and Nikos returned to Athens and opened what was described as a private chef business which led to the opening of Funky Gourmet. After they opened OPSO, they opened Pitta Bun in the Carnaby section of London. In 2017, she was named Best Female Chef in Greece and in the same year, 4th Best Female Chef in the World according to The Best Chef Awards.
