= Georgina Sutton =

Australian pilot (born 1961)

Georgina Sutton (born 1961) is an Australian aviator and former police officer from Adelaide, best known for being the first woman to be appointed as chief pilot for an Australian airline. Sutton began her aviation journey at 16 years old by flying gliders. Having obtained her power licence, she joined South Australia Police to fund her commercial pilot licence. Sutton commenced her aviation career flying small propeller aircraft for a regional airline before accepting a job with Qantas as a second officer on the Boeing 747 in 1989. During her time flying the 747, Sutton was promoted to first officer and in 1992, flew Queen Elizabeth II from London to Singapore. She became fleet captain for the Boeing 767 in 2014, which at the time was the highest position held by a female pilot at a major Australian airline. In 2015, she made history as the first woman to serve as chief pilot for Jetstar Airways. Sutton returned to Qantas in 2017 as a manager of base operations. Outside of her career, she is married and enjoys water-skiing.

== Early life ==
Sutton was born in 1961 and raised in Adelaide. She flew gliders from the age of 16. After acquiring a glider licence, she progressed to a power licence before becoming a policewoman with the South Australia Police to fund the cost of acquiring a commercial pilot's licence.

== Aviation career ==
In 1989, Sutton was working as a Cessna 421 pilot for a small regional airline when she received an offer to work for Qantas as a Sydney-based second officer on the Boeing 747. By 1992, having been promoted to first officer, Sutton flew a flight from London to Singapore with Queen Elizabeth on board.

In 2014, Sutton was appointed as the Boeing 767 fleet captain, which was the highest position a female pilot had ever achieved at a major Australian airline. The following year, Sutton became chief pilot for Jetstar Airways, a Qantas subsidiary. She is the first woman to hold the position of chief pilot with an Australian airline. in 2017, Sutton left Jetstar and returned to Qantas as a manager of base operations.

In August 2025, Sutton retired after a distinguished 36-year career as a pilot. Her final service operated from New York (JFK) via Auckland (AKL) to Sydney (SYD).

== Personal life ==
Sutton is married, and is a keen water-skier.
