= Georgia L. McMurray =

American civic worker and child care advocate (1934–1992)

- Born: March 18, 1934; Philadelphia
- Died: December 18, 1992 (aged 58)
- Education: Temple University, BA; Bryn Mawr College, MA
- Years active: 1966-1992
- Known for: Activism for children and adolescents
- Awards: Essence Award

Georgia L. McMurray (March 18, 1934– December 18, 1992) was a New York City administrator and an activist for children, adolescents, and people with disabilities.

== Biography ==
McMurray was born on March 18, 1934, in Philadelphia to Daisy Gatewood McMurray (later Daisy Gatewood McMurray Fullen), a cafeteria worker and garment worker, and George McMurray, a barber. McMurray attended the Girls' High School and was awarded a college scholarship. McMurray had Charcot–Marie–Tooth disease, and from her childhood could not participate in strenuous activity with her peers.

In 1956, McMurray graduated from Temple University with a bachelor's degree in sociology. In 1962, she earned her Master of Arts degree in social work from Bryn Mawr College. During graduate school, she refused an operation to treat her McMurray had Charcot–Marie–Tooth disease that would have required she be in traction for nine months.

In 1966, McMurray founded Project Teen Girls, a program that supported pregnant teens. The program advocated for them to be allowed to remain in school, rather than be expelled as was typical at the time. It also provided the teens with home and mental health services and homemaking courses. In 1969, McMurray was appointed by New York City mayor John Lindsay to direct an early childhood task force, which led to the New York City Agency for Child Development with McMurray as its founding commissioner. In this position, McMurray introduced programs for children of working parents and was a strong advocate for publicly funded daycare.

In the early 1970s, McMurray had two artificial hip replacement surgeries and began using crutches. In 1974, when Ed Koch became mayor of New York City, McMurray tendered her resignation in alignment with the standard professional courtecy done by agency administrators. However, although many other administrators' resignations were not accepted, McMurray's was, likely due to political pressure against her reappointment. Her physical disability was used as justification for accepting her resignation.

McMurray cofounded, with assistant director for public education David Seeley, the Alliance for Children. In 1978, McMurray became the deputy general director of programming for research and policy organization Community Service Society. She remained in this position until 1986. In the position, she challenged the Koch administration's lack of child welfare reform.

In 1977, McMurray was a New York Delegate to the Women's Conference. She was involved in drafting Plank 7: Disabled Women, which identified the challenges disabled women faced, including the that they often had their children taken away from them. It also described the "double discrimination" of disabled women.

McMurray's health continued to deteriorate. In the 1980s, she developed tetraplegia and was confined to a motorized scooter. She learned to use a computer manipulated by a mouthpiece to continue her advocacy. After recovering from a coma related to her disease, McMurray advocated for advance healthcare directives to be able to determine medical decisions including terminating life support.

In 1986, McMurray founded the GLM Group to provide support to government and non-profit organizations working with families and children. At this time she also taught as a Distinguished Professor of Social Policy at Fordham University's Graduate School of Social Service.

On April 10, 1992, Oprah Winfrey presented McMurray with the Essence Award in honor of her work.

McMurray died on December 18, 1992, in her New York home.

== Awards ==
- 1985: Dr. Leo B. Marsh Memorial Award
- 1986: New York Urban League's Building Brick Award
- 1982: Children's Aid Society gave her its Distinguished Service Award
- 1992: Essence Award
