= IP codec =

Codec used to send video or audio signals over IP network

IP codecs are used to send video or audio signals over an IP network such as the Internet. The initials "IP" here stand for "Internet Protocol", while the term "codec" is short for "encoder/decoder" or "compressor/decompressor".

== IP video codecs ==
IP video codecs are used widely in security and broadcast applications to send video between two locations. Video codecs use compression algorithms to send good video quality at substantially lower bit rates than uncompressed signals. Broadcast applications often use MPEG-2 and H.264/MPEG-4 AVC standards for video compression. The EBU is working on a minimum set of common standards for real-time video over IP transmissions. The recommended standards and protocols are designed to ensure compatibility between different codecs and provide adequate high-quality transmissions.

== IP audio codecs ==
IP audio codecs are used to send broadcast quality audio over IP from remote broadcast locations to radio and television studios around the globe. IP codecs are ideal for use in remote broadcasts, as studio/transmitter links (STLs) or for studio-to-studio audio distribution.

IP audio codecs use audio compression algorithms to send high-fidelity audio over both wired broadband IP networks and wireless broadband networks.
