= POTS codec =

Type of audio codec

A POTS codec is a type of audio coder-decoder (codec) that uses digital signal processing to transmit audio digitally over standard telephone lines (plain old telephone service, POTS) at a higher level of audio quality than the telephone line would normally provide in its analog mode. The POTS codec is one of a family of broadcast codecs differentiated by the type of telecommunication circuit used for transmission. The ISDN codec, which instead uses ISDN lines, and the IP codec which uses private or public IP networks are also common.

Primarily used in broadcast engineering to link remote broadcast locations to the host studio, a hardware codec, implemented with digital signal processing, is used to compress the audio data enough to travel through a pair of a 33.6k modems.

POTS codecs have the disadvantages of being restricted to relatively low bit rates and being susceptible to variable line quality. ISDN and IP codecs have the advantage of being natively digital, and operate at much higher bitrates, which results in fewer compression artifacts. Special lines must be run to a location, however, and must be ordered well in advance of the event so that there is ample time for installation of equipment. Since POTS lines are almost universally available, the POTS codec can be set up nearly anywhere with little or no notice.

== Functions ==
Codecs usually come in two types of units: rackmount for the studio and portable for the remote. Audio can be sent in either direction, and most can also pass low-speed non-audio data, allowing the remote DJ to control broadcast automation or other studio equipment via RS-232. Many have an automatic redial if the line should become disconnected. The remote unit usually has some basic mixer functions, while the studio unit usually has some kind of digital output.

Some codecs can be configured to use ISDN, POTS or IP rather than requiring a different device for each network, while others are exclusively designed for POTS operation. ISDN and IP connections implement algorithms like G.722, MPEG, AAC, aacPlus, Apt-X and AAC-LD (low-delay), while POTS connections almost always use proprietary low-bitrate algorithms. Consequently, while ISDN connections can usually be established between codecs from different manufacturers, POTS connections (and usually IP connections) can only be established between codecs from the same family. Some codecs can use GSM networks, and some have variable bitrate to compensate for poor connections. It is sometimes possible to bond two POTS lines together for redundancy and fault tolerance, and improved bandwidth.

Codecs are made by Comrex, Sonifex, Tieline, APT, Telos and Prodys among others.
