= Telephone hybrid =

Telephone circuit element

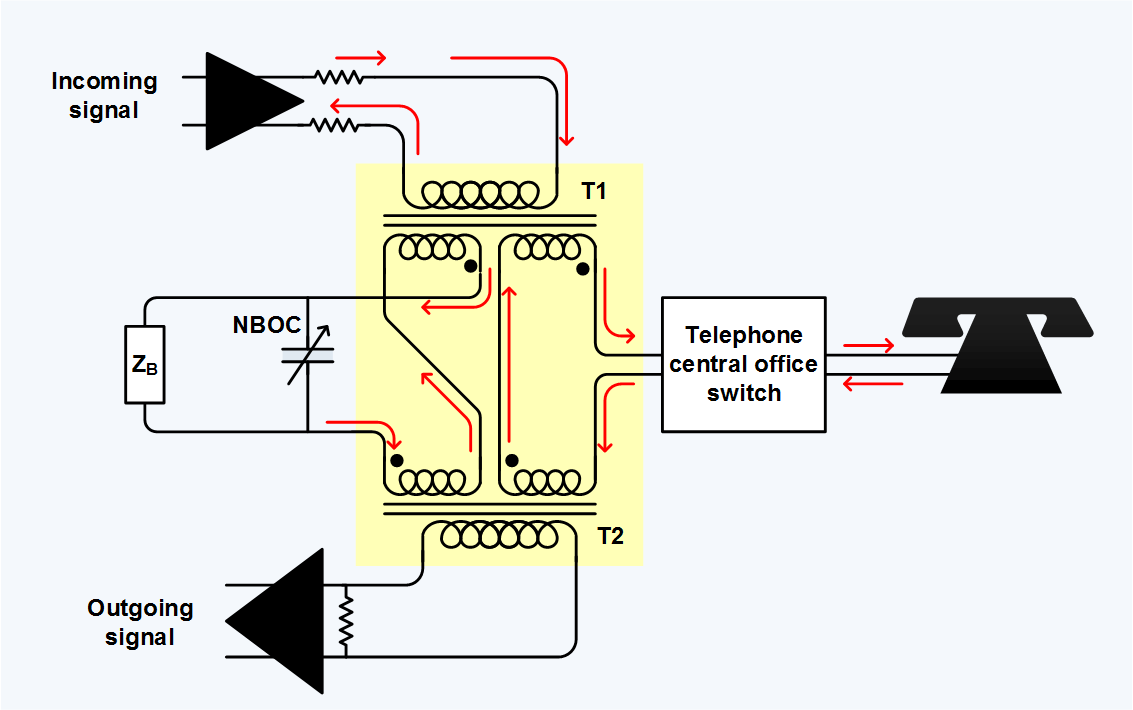
Telephone hybrid transformer at the interface of the four-wire long-distance trunk and the two-wire local loop. Z_{B} is the balance termination. NBOC is the network build-out capacitor, which is set to the average shunt capacitance through the telephone central office switch. Red arrows show relative current flow.

In analog telephony, a telephone hybrid is the component at the ends of a subscriber line of the public switched telephone network (PSTN) that converts between two-wire and four-wire forms of bidirectional audio paths. When used in broadcast facilities to enable the airing of telephone callers, the broadcast-quality telephone hybrid is known as a broadcast telephone hybrid or telephone balance unit.

The need for hybrids comes from the nature of analog plain old telephone service (POTS) home or small business telephone lines, where the two audio directions are combined on a single two-wire pair. Within the telephone network, switching and transmission are almost always four-wire circuits with the two signals being separated. Hybrids perform the necessary conversion. In older analog networks, conversion to four-wire was required so that repeater amplifiers could be inserted in long-distance links. In today's digital systems, each speech direction must be processed and transported independently.

The line cards in a telephone central office switch that are interfaced to analog lines include hybrids that adapt the four-wire network to the two-wire circuits that connect most subscribers.

The search for better telephone hybrids and echo cancelers (a related technology) was an important motive for the development of DSP (digital signal processing) algorithms and hardware at Bell Labs, NEC, and other sites.

== Technology ==
The fundamental principle is that of impedance matching. The incoming signal is applied to both the telephone line and a "balancing network" that is designed to have the same impedance as the line. The outgoing signal is derived by subtracting the two, thus canceling the incoming signal from the outgoing signal. Early hybrids were made with transformers configured as hybrid coils that had an extra winding that could be connected out of phase. The name hybrid comes from these special mixed-winding transformers.

An effective hybrid would have high trans-hybrid loss, which means that relatively little of the incoming audio would appear on the outgoing port. Too much leakage can cause echoes when there is a delay in the transmission path, as there is with satellite, mobile phone, and VoIP links. This is a result of a talker's voice traversing to the far-end hybrid and returning to his own receiver with insufficient attenuation. ITU-T Recommendation G.131 describes the relationship of echo delay vs. amplitude to listener annoyance. At 100ms, 45 dB return loss is required for less than 1% of test subjects to express dissatisfaction.

Good cancellation depends upon the balancing network having a frequency-vs.-impedance characteristic that accurately matches the line. Since telephone line impedances vary depending upon many factors and the relationship is not always smooth, analog hybrids are able to achieve only a few dB of guaranteed isolation. For this reason, modern hybrids use digital signal processing to implement an adaptive least mean squares filter that automatically detects the line's impedance across the voice frequency range and adjusts to it. These may reach greater than 30 dB trans-hybrid loss, measured with white noise as the send signal.

DSP hybrids are also called "line echo cancellers" (LECs). (The phrase "echo canceller" in this context is misleading since there is no cancellation of echo per se but rather of leakage from the analog line interface with very short time delay more accurately characterized as phase-shift. However, any uncancelled hybrid leakage will cause echo when the associated transmission path has delay, so the effect on the system is reduction of echo.)

Hybrids and cancellers are sometimes combined with echo suppressors. These work on the assumption that usually only one of the two parties to a conversation is speaking at a given time. The suppressor switches a loss into the inactive speech path, thus enhancing the echo-cancelling effect of the hybrid at the expense of simultaneous two-way conversation.

Despite being inherently four-wire, VoIP systems require hybrids when they interface to two-wire lines. A VoIP-to-Telco gateway used to interface a VoIP PBX (private branch exchange) to analog lines would contain hybrids to perform the required conversion. End-end VoIP needs no hybrids unless adaptation to a two-wire line is required.

== Broadcast telephone hybrids ==
In broadcast studio facilities, the name for the functional part has come to refer to the whole, and a telephone hybrid is the device that packages all the functions needed to connect telephone lines to studio audio systems, providing electrical and physical interface between the telco lines and studio equipment. These devices often include processing in addition to the hybrid function, such as dynamics control, filtering, and equalization (EQ). Some have dynamic EQ that adjusts parameters automatically to maintain spectral consistency from widely varying source audio. Some incorporate acoustic echo cancellation to allow setups with acoustic paths between loudspeakers carrying phone audio and microphones feeding the phone lines.

In studio applications, a hybrid needs particularly good send-to-receive isolation. When too much of the host audio appears at the hybrid's output, there will be a number of defects. Distortion of the host's voice can result from the telephone line's changing the phase of the send audio before it returns, with varying shifts at different frequencies. The original and leakage audio are mixed at the console and combine in and out of phase at the various frequencies. When this occurs, the host sounds either hollow or tinny as the phase cancellation affects some frequencies more than others. Audio feedback can result from the acoustic coupling created when callers must be heard on a loudspeaker. When lines are conferenced and the gain around the loop of the multiple hybrids is greater than unity, feedback "singing" will be audible. If the leakage is very high, operators will not be able to control the relative levels of the host audio and the caller since the console telephone fader will affect both signals.

The digital signal processing technology used in modern hybrids addresses the isolation requirement and implements ancillary functions. ISDN and VoIP telco connections theoretically have no need for hybrids. However, calls that have ISDN or VoIP on one end usually terminate to an analog line at the other, and so there is a significant source of echo from both the telco hybrid on the line card and the phone itself. Acoustic coupling, when the microphone picks up the output of the earpiece, is another potential source of echo. Electrical pickup between analog circuits (crosstalk) is yet another. Even low echo levels can be audible when there is a long delay, as is usually the case with VoIP.

Telephone hybrids intended for studio applications are usually rack-mount units that have RJ-style connectors for the telephone line and either balanced analog or AES3 audio inputs/outputs on XLR connectors for the studio equipment connection. One, two, or more hybrids might be packaged within a unit. There are variations to accommodate either POTS, ISDN, or VoIP telephone lines. In addition to the audio functions, hybrids can include extra capabilities such as auto-answer/disconnect, DTMF detection/generation, and Caller ID detection.

Some inexpensive adapters connect between a telephone and its handset, with a button to activate either the handset or the adapter. These are simple passive devices that pass the audio from the telephone without processing.

At the other end of the spectrum are systems that can handle multiple lines and connect to a computer so that a producer can follow who is on which line, communicate with the host, and manage the order of taking calls.

Telephone hybrids are also used to interface production intercom systems to the PSTN.

== Related equipment ==
POTS codecs, ISDN codecs, and IP codecs are used for remote broadcasts when it is possible to have specialized equipment at both ends of the connection. POTS codecs work with analog lines, ISDN codecs with ISDN lines, and IP codecs with any link that can provide IP connectivity. These employ audio data compression and decompression at each end. Audio bandwidths up to 20 kHz can be achieved this way. Compression is often via MPEG MP3 or AAC.

Autopatches are telephone hybrids used by amateur radio operators to interface their radio equipment with telephone lines.

== See also ==
- Adaptive feedback cancellation
- Remote pickup unit
