= Remote broadcast =

Broadcasting not done in a formal studio

In broadcast engineering, a remote broadcast (usually just called a remote or a live remote, or in news parlance, a live shot) is broadcasting done from a location away from a formal television or radio studio and is considered an electronic field production (EFP). A remote pickup unit (RPU) is usually used to transmit the audio and/or video back to the broadcast station, where it joins the normal airchain. Other methods include satellite trucks, production trucks and even regular telephone lines if necessary.

== History ==
The first airing of a remote broadcast came in 1924, when Loew's Theater publicist and WHN (New York City) station manager Nils Granlund leased telegraph lines from Western Union to provide the first link in what became called cabaret broadcasting." By early 1925, Granlund had established remote lines between WHN and more than thirty New York City jazz nightclubs, including the Silver Slipper, The Parody Club, the Cotton Club, the Strand Roof, and Club Moritz. These big band remotes would become a staple of the old-time radio era, lasting well into the 1950s.

Nils T. Granlund cited the 1925 WHN airing of Senator James J. Walker's announcement of his New York City mayoral candidacy through a remote broadcast from the New York Press Club as the first such remote link for a political forum.

In Latin America on 27 October 1920, Dr Sussini made the first remote transmission in Argentina from the theatre El Coliseo in Buenos Aires. In Mexico on 27 September 1921, Adolfo Gomez Fernandez made a transmission from the Teatro Ideal, Mexico DF

The very first live remote broadcast to the nation was by the Canadian Broadcasting Corporation in 1938 when Frank Willis reported on the Moose River Gold Mine disaster in Nova Scotia http://archives.cbc.ca/economy_business/natural_resources/clips/3860/

On 11 June 1955, NBC, The National Broadcasting Company, provided the 1st live remote broadcast to the nation from Niagara Falls, New York.

== Radio ==
In radio, remotes are often used for special events, such as concerts or sporting events, where either the entire event or advertisements for the event are broadcast on location. The cost of personnel and equipment is usually paid for by the host at each performance. However, if the event is recurring, such as a weekly broadcast from a nightclub, then dedicated lines are usually installed by the local telephone company in order to save on costs. With low range radio stations, and at events with no telephone lines, several radio stations will call into the studio request line with a cell phone and microphone setup. From there, another DJ in the studio will put them on-location live on the air via the studio request line. Some stations use this method when doing live broadcasts in areas where the signal is weak.

Originally, analog audio broadcasts were sent through telephone hybrids, which, although low quality, were found to be acceptable for voice broadcasts. Later, frequency extenders were developed that used additional lines, shifting higher treble audio frequencies down on one end and back up on the other, providing a reasonable reproduction of the original sound. Currently, digital lines, such as ISDN or DSL, are used to send compressed digital audio back to the studio. In addition, modern remote pickup units have become extremely portable and can transmit single-channel monophonic FM-quality audio over regular telephone lines using built-in modems and advanced compression algorithms (MPEG-4, etc.). See POTS codec.

== Television ==
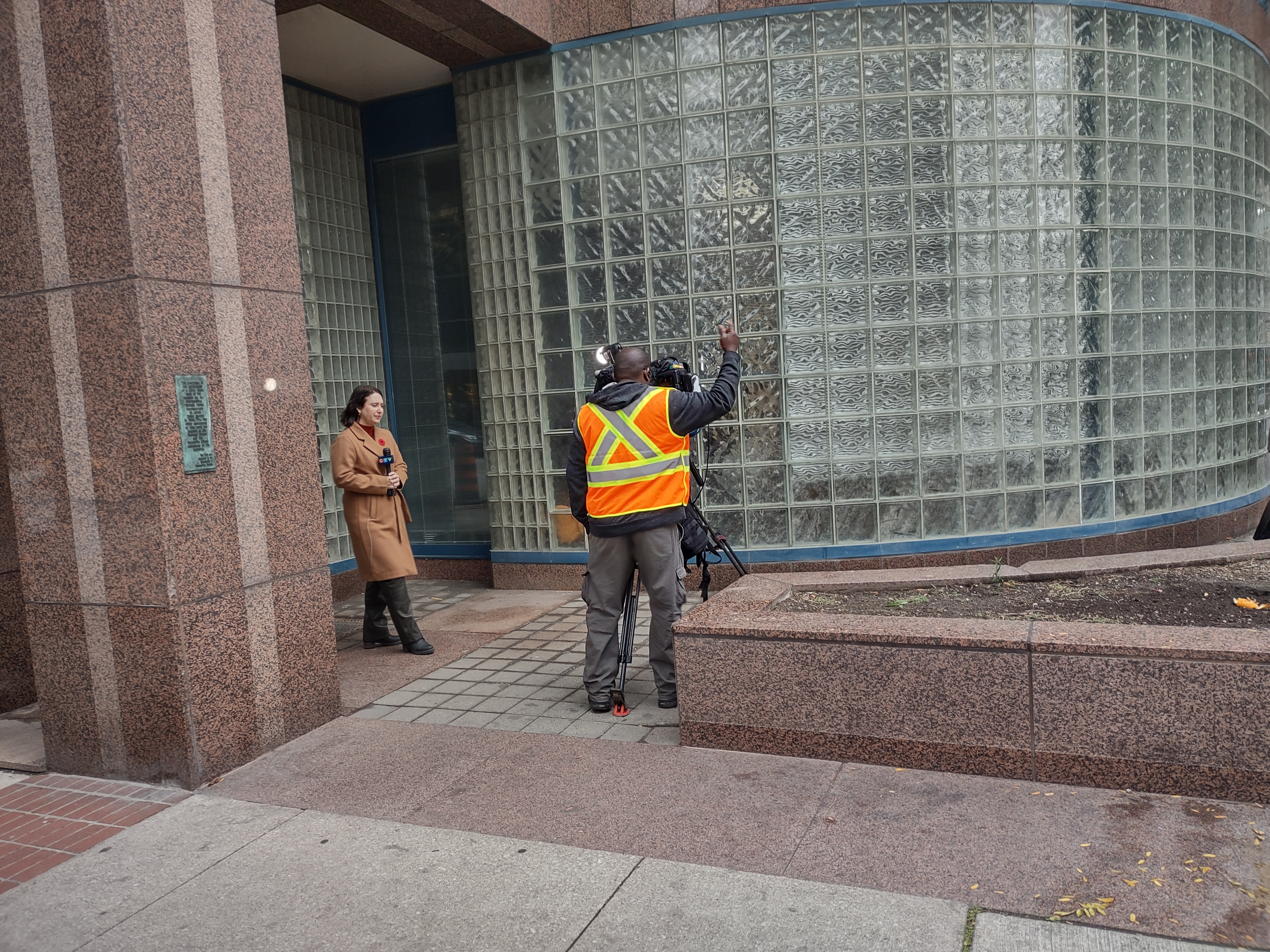
Remote report at Toronto Police HQ

In TV, live television remotes are an almost daily part of television news broadcasts in the United States. As a part of electronic news gathering (ENG), remotes are meant to bring the audience to the scene of the action.

To get to the scene quickly, a live remote may be done from a helicopter.

Live television remotes may often be used in a manner similar to radio remotes (and vice versa) as well.

== See also ==
- Remote recording
- Remote integration model
