= Georgia Brown (Brazilian singer) =

Brazilian singer

- Born: Rossana Monti; Naples, Italy
- Origin: Brazil
- Genres: R&B, pop, house, gospel
- Occupation: Singer
- Years active: 1988–present
- Label: Storck
- Website: georgiabrown.com

Rossana Monti, better known by the stage name Georgia Brown, is a Brazilian singer noted for her extensive vocal range (8 octaves).

== Career ==
At the age of fifteen, Brown toured as backup vocalist for Brazilian singer Jorge Ben, during his "W Brasil Tour" in 1995. Following the conclusion of the tour, she entered in contests "Skol Rock" and "Fest Valda". In 1997, Brown relocated to California in the United States of America to begin recording her first album. In 2001, Brown released her debut album "Black Nature". The album spawned the singles: "Commit A Crime" and "Hold On". Following the release of her debut album, she headlined her first tour "Black Nature Tour". In 2002, "Black Nature" was certified gold in Brazil with sales in excess of 120,000 copies.

In 2003, she released a single "Forgiven". The song was remixed by DJ Patife and featured on his album "Na Estrada", released in 2005. In 2004, she released her second album Heart Beats, which became certified platinum in Brazil. She headlined first international tour "Heart Beats World Tour" in 2004. In 2004, Brown broke American singer Mariah Carey's vocal records on Guinness World Records and received a certificate for two records: "World's Greatest Vocal Range by a Female G_{2}-G_{10}" and "World's Highest Note "G_{10}".

In 2006, Brown began recording her third album. In 2008, she released her third studio album The Renascence of Soul. In 2010, Brown released house music single titled "Love 4 Real". In 2012, she released an extended play entitled Me & Myself.

In July 2018, Brown released a single "#HighVibration (Sweet Sensation)".

== Discography ==
=== Albums ===
- Black Nature (2001)
- Heart Beats (2004)
- The Renascence of Soul (2008)
- Me & Myself – EP (2012)

=== Singles ===
- "Commit A Crime" (2001)
- "Hold On" (2001)
- "Forgiven" (2003)
- "Lost Love" (2004)
- "Art A Shield for Me" (2008)
- "Save My Soul" (2008)
- "Loneliness" (2009)
- "Love 4 Real" (2010)
- "#HighVibration (Sweet Sensation)" (2018)
