= Synchronization =

Coordination of events to operate a system in unison

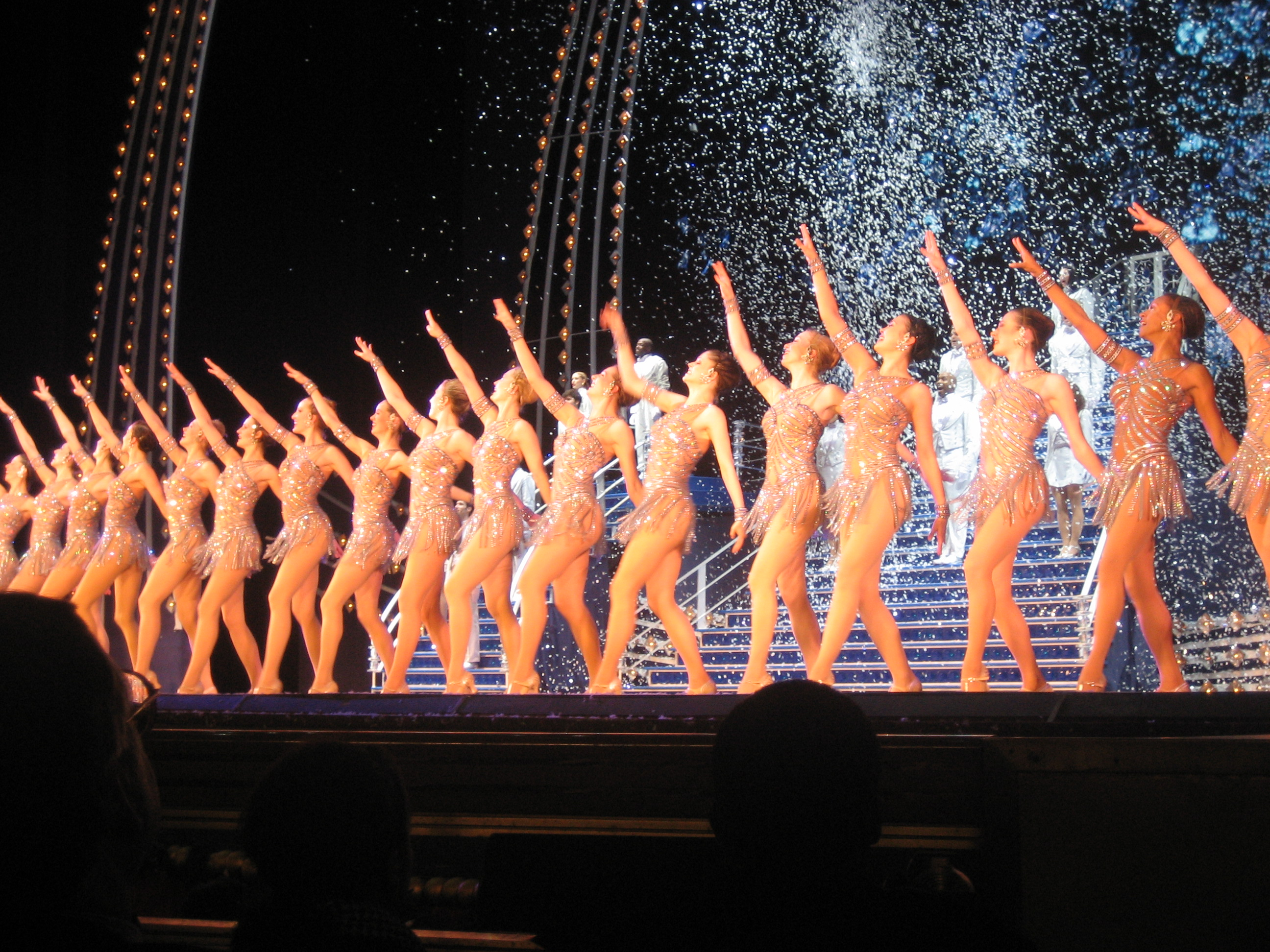
Synchronized dancers

Synchronization is the coordination of events to operate a system in unison. For example, the conductor of an orchestra keeps the orchestra synchronized or in time. Systems that operate with all parts in synchrony are said to be synchronous or in sync—and those that are not are asynchronous.

Today, time synchronization can occur between systems around the world through satellite navigation signals and other time and frequency transfer techniques.

== Navigation and railways ==
Time-keeping and synchronization of clocks is a critical problem in long-distance ocean navigation. Before radio navigation and satellite-based navigation, navigators required accurate time in conjunction with astronomical observations to determine how far east or west their vessel traveled. The invention of an accurate marine chronometer revolutionized marine navigation. By the end of the 19th century, important ports provided time signals in the form of a signal gun, flag, or dropping time ball so that mariners could check and correct their chronometers for error.

Synchronization was important in the operation of 19th-century railways, these being the first major means of transport fast enough for differences in local mean time between nearby towns to be noticeable. Each line handled the problem by synchronizing all its stations to headquarters as a standard railway time. In some territories, companies shared a single railroad track and needed to avoid collisions. The need for strict timekeeping led the companies to settle on one standard, and civil authorities eventually abandoned local mean time in favor of railway time.

== Communication ==
In electrical engineering terms, for digital logic and data transfer, a synchronous circuit requires a clock signal. A clock signal simply signals the start or end of some time period, often measured in microseconds or nanoseconds, that has an arbitrary relationship to any other system of measurement of the passage of minutes, hours, and days.

In a different sense, electronic systems are sometimes synchronized to make events at points far apart appear simultaneous or near-simultaneous from a certain perspective. (Note: Albert Einstein proved in 1905 in his first relativity paper that there actually are no such things as absolutely simultaneous events.) Timekeeping technologies such as the GPS satellites and Network Time Protocol (NTP) provide real-time access to a close approximation to the UTC timescale and are used for many terrestrial synchronization applications of this kind.

In computer science (especially parallel computing), synchronization is the coordination of simultaneous threads or processes to complete a task with correct runtime order and no unexpected race conditions; see synchronization (computer science) for details.

Synchronization is also an important concept in the following fields:

- Cryptography
- Lip sync
- Multimedia
- Network Physiology
- Neuroscience
- Photography
- Physics (The idea of simultaneity has many difficulties, both in practice and theory.)
- Rhythm
- Synthesizers
- Telecommunication
  - Frame synchronization
  - Synchronization (video)

== Dynamical systems ==
A mechanical demonstration of synchronization of oscillators: metronomes, initially out of phase, synchronize through small motions of the base on which they are placed

Synchronization of multiple interacting dynamical systems can occur when the systems are autonomous oscillators. Poincaré phase oscillators are model systems that can interact and partially synchronize within random or regular networks. In the case of global synchronization of phase oscillators, an abrupt transition from unsynchronized to full synchronization takes place when the coupling strength exceeds a critical threshold. This is known as the Kuramoto model phase transition. Synchronization is an emergent property that occurs in a broad range of dynamical systems, including neural signaling, the beating of the heart, the synchronization of fire-fly light waves and mechanical coupling based bats swaying synchronisation. A unified approach that quantifies synchronization in chaotic systems can be derived from the statistical analysis of measured data.

== Applications ==
=== Network Physiology ===
Synchronization and global synchronization phenomena play essential roles in the multidisciplinary field of Network Physiology which focuses on understanding how the dynamic interactions among human physiological systems and organs across spatiotemporal scales give rise to emerging states at the organism level and influence human health. Amplitude, frequency, and phase synchronization, as forms of coupling and interaction, underlie biological and physiological network mechanisms through which global states, functions and behaviors emerge at the system and organism level. Synchronization has been reported across physiological systems and levels of integration, including cardio-respiratory coupling; maternal-fetal cardiac phase-synchronization; brain blood flow velocity vs. peripheral blood pressure in stroke; synchronization in neuron synaptic function; organ networks; EEG-synchronization and EEG-desynchronization in NREM and REM sleep; brain waves synchronization and anti-synchronization during rest, exercise, cognitive tasks, sleep and wake; cortico-muscular synchronization; synchronization in pancreatic cells and metabolism; inter-muscular muscle fibers synchronization in exercise and fatigue; neuromodulation and Parkinson's, dystonia and epilepsy; circadian synchrony of sleep, nutrition and physical activity.

=== Neuroscience ===
In cognitive neuroscience, (stimulus-dependent) (phase-)synchronous oscillations of neuron populations serve to solve the general binding problem. According to the so-called Binding-By-Synchrony (BBS) Hypothesis a precise temporal correlation between the impulses of neurons ("cross-correlation analysis") and thus a stimulus-dependent temporal synchronization of the coherent activity of subpopulations of neurons emerges. Moreover, this synchronization mechanism circumvents the superposition problem by more effectively identifying the signature of synchronous neuronal signals as belonging together for subsequent (sub-)cortical information processing areas.

=== Cognitive science ===
In cognitive science, integrative (phase) synchronization mechanisms in cognitive neuroarchitectures of modern connectionism that include coupled oscillators (e.g., "Oscillatory Networks") are used to solve the binding problem of cognitive neuroscience in perceptual cognition ("feature binding") and in language cognition ("variable binding").

=== Biological networks ===
There is a concept that the synchronization of biochemical reactions determines biological homeostasis. According to this theory, all reactions occurring in a living cell are synchronized in terms of quantities and timescales to maintain biological network functional.

A 2026 preprint by Kumar and Kodio reported that flying fox bats (Pteropus giganteus) roosting on shared tree branches can exhibit synchronized swaying oscillations through mechanical coupling, particularly in response to wind-induced disturbances.

== Human movement ==
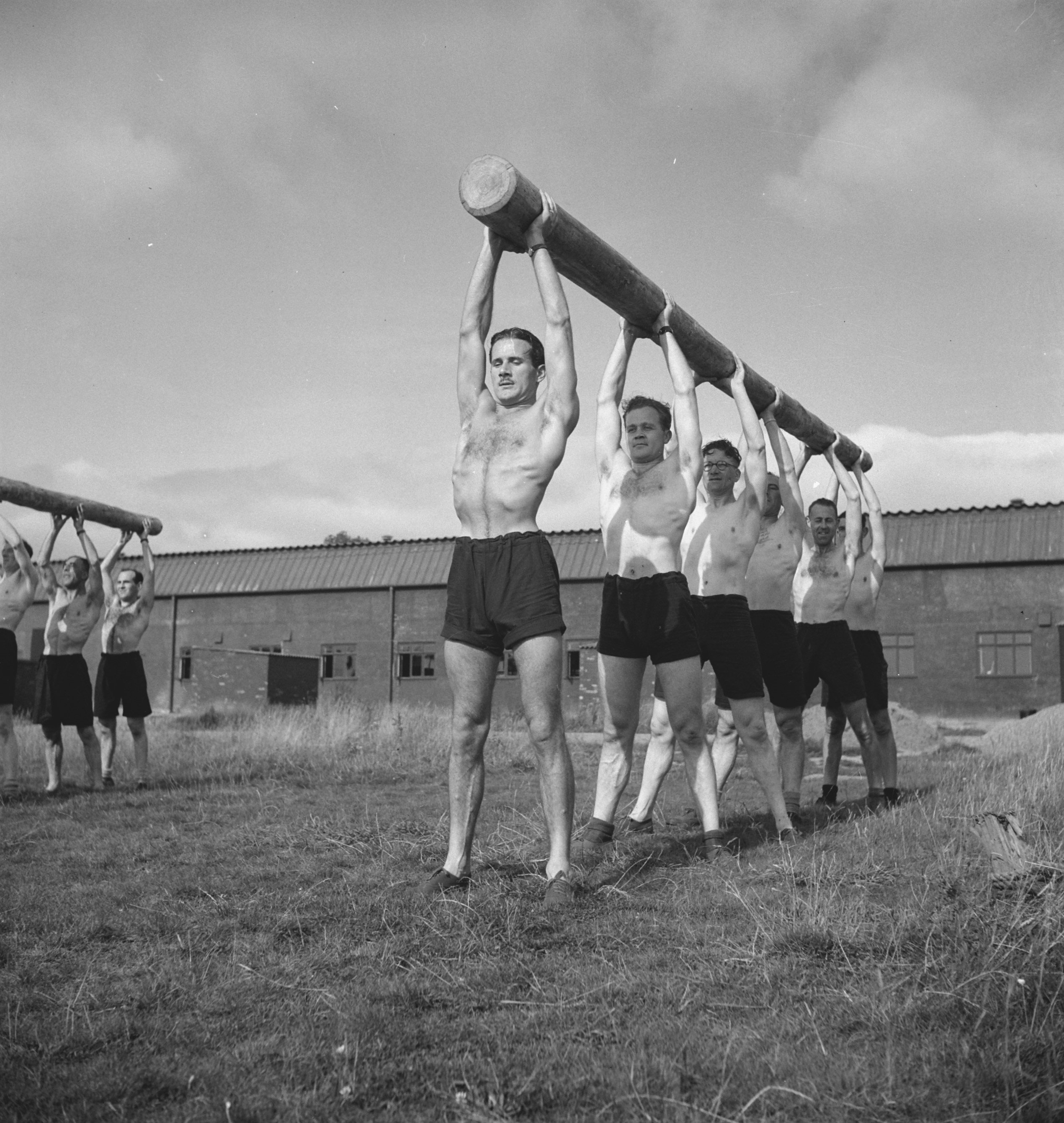
Troops use synchronization to learn teamwork

Synchronization of movement is defined as similar movements between two or more people who are temporally aligned. This is different from mimicry, which occurs after a short delay. Line dance and military step are examples.

Muscular bonding is the idea that moving in time evokes particular emotions. This sparked some of the first research into movement synchronization and its effects on human emotion. In groups, synchronization of movement has been shown to increase conformity, cooperation and trust.

In dyads, groups of two people, synchronization has been demonstrated to increase affiliation, self-esteem, compassion and altruistic behaviour and increase rapport. During arguments, synchrony between the arguing pair has been noted to decrease; however, it is not clear whether this is due to the change in emotion or other factors. There is evidence to show that movement synchronization requires other people to cause its beneficial effects, as the effect on affiliation does not occur when one of the dyad is synchronizing their movements to something outside the dyad. This is known as interpersonal synchrony.

The true effect of synchrony in these studies has been disputed. Research in this area detailing the positive effects of synchrony has attributed this to synchrony alone; however, many of the experiments incorporate a shared intention to achieve synchrony. Indeed, the Reinforcement of Cooperation Model suggests that perception of synchrony leads to reinforcement that cooperation is occurring, which leads to the pro-social effects of synchrony. More research is required to separate the effect of intentionality from the beneficial effect of synchrony.

== Uses ==
Synchronization is important in digital telephony, video and digital audio where streams of sampled data are manipulated. Synchronization of image and sound was an important technical problem in sound film. More sophisticated film, video, and audio applications use time code to synchronize audio and video. In movie and television production, it is necessary to synchronize video frames from multiple cameras. In addition to enabling basic editing, synchronization can also be used for 3D reconstruction.

In electric power systems, alternator synchronization is required when multiple generators are connected to an electrical grid.

Arbiters are needed in digital electronic systems such as microprocessors to deal with asynchronous inputs. There are also electronic digital circuits called synchronizers that attempt to perform arbitration in one clock cycle. Synchronizers, unlike arbiters, are prone to failure. (See metastability in electronics).

Encryption systems usually require some synchronization mechanism to ensure that the receiving cipher is decoding the right bits at the right time.

Automotive transmissions contain synchronizers that bring the toothed rotating parts (gears and splined shaft) to the same rotational velocity before engaging the teeth.

Flash synchronization synchronizes the flash with the shutter.

Some systems may be only approximately synchronized, or plesiochronous. Some applications require that relative offsets between events be determined. For others, only the order of the event is important.

== See also ==
- Atomic clock
- Clock synchronization
- Data synchronization
- Double-ended synchronization
- Einstein synchronisation
- Entrainment (physics)
- Eskimo yo-yo
- Homochronous
- Mutual exclusion
- Phase-locked loop
- Phase synchronization
- Reciprocal socialization
- Synchronization (alternating current)
- Synchronization of chaos
- Synchronization rights
- Synchronizer (disambiguation)
- Synchronous conferencing
- Timing synchronization function (TSF)
- Neural synchrony

Order synchronization and related topics

- Concurrency control
- Interlocking
- Rendezvous problem
- Room synchronization
- Synchronization gear

Video and audio engineering

- Genlock
- Jam sync
- SMPTE timecode
- Timecode
- Word clock

Compare with

- Asynchrony (disambiguation)
- Comparison of synchronous and asynchronous signalling
- Synchronicity, an alternative organizing principle to causality conceived by Carl Jung.
