= Glossary of broadcasting terms =

This glossary of terms used in broadcasting is a list of definitions of terms and concepts related to both radio and television broadcasting, along with the industry in general.

== A ==
ABC
1. The American Broadcasting Company, a major television network in the United States. Also operates radio networks ABC News Radio and ABC Audio.
2. The ABC Radio Network, a former radio network in the United States. Renamed Citadel Media in 2009, Cumulus Media Networks in 2011 and merged into Westwood One.
3. The Australian Broadcasting Corporation, Australia's main public service broadcaster.
4. Associated Broadcasting Corporation, a former name for Filipino media company TV5 Network and owners of television network TV5, formerly "ABC5".
5. ABC, a former regional news program that aired over Sweden television broadcaster Sveriges Television.
6. ABC Weekend TV, a former ITV franchise in Manchester, Birmingham and London.
7. Asahi Broadcasting Corporation, (Japanese: 朝日放送株式会社), a Japanese television and radio broadcaster.
8. Associated Broadcasting Company, a former name of Associated Television, a former ITV franchise.
9. XEABC-AM in Mexico City, which formerly branded as "ABC Radio".
ABS-CBN
The Alto Broadcasting System–Chronicle Broadcasting Network, a major television broadcaster in the Philippines.
ACMA
Australian Communications and Media Authority: The regulator of broadcasting in Australia.
A/D
Analog-to-digital conversion.
absolute event
A scheduled event whose start time is determined with an assigned time based upon the facility master clock.
access time
The total time required to find, retrieve and commence using information, also known as lead time.
actives
Listeners who contact the radio show regarding requests, contests or other interaction.
ADC
Analog-to-digital converter: A device to convert analog signals to digital.
ADI
Area of dominant influence: The Arbitron equivalent to Designated Market Areas, produced from 1966 until Arbitron's exit from television ratings.
aggregation
The 1980s–1990s process by which individual Australian regional television stations converted to competing in much larger broadcast areas consisting of multiple stations. See Regional television in Australia § Aggregation.
Aircheck
The recorded copy of a broadcast.
AM stereo
Two different, and mutually incompatible, multiplexing transmission techniques that provide stereophonic sound on the mediumwave (AM) band. See independent sideband (ISB; initially standard in the U.S.) and quadrature amplitude modulation (QAM; standard in Canada, Australia and Japan and later the U.S.).
AMD
AM drive time: The morning rush hour slot.
Amplitude modulation

A modulation technique used in electronic communication where the amplitude (signal strength) of the wave is varied in proportion to that of the message signal. Developed in the early 1900s, this technique is most commonly used for transmitting an audio signal via a radio wave measured in kilohertz (kHz). See AM broadcasting.
Analog recording
Recording of audio using an electronic signal that varies continuously. The main drawback of analog recording is the introduction of inherent noise to the recorded signal.
Analog transmission
The broadcasting of a signal using an analog recording. Examples of use include radio.
ANATEL
1. The National Telecommunications Agency (Portuguese: Agência Nacional de Telecomunicações), regulator of broadcasting in Brazil.
2. The National Television Association (Asociación Nacional de Televisión), group of national television broadcasters in Chile.
Annoyance factor
Irritating aspect of advertising that can strengthen or weaken messaging.
Apex band
A grouping of radio stations in the United States in the late 1930s, all with experimental licenses, that were launched to evaluate potential additional frequencies for radio stations. Named "apex" for transmission antennas needing to be placed on very high locations for line-of-sight reception. A direct precursor to FM radio, several of these stations were converted to the FM band between 1941 and 1944.
Arbitron
The company that provided the industry-accepted standard for radio audience measurement. Often abbreviated as ARB, a relic of its former name, American Research Bureau. Arbitron also rated television programming until 1993. Since acquired by Nielsen Media Research and now known as Nielsen Audio.
Archive
1. Storage of master material under controlled conditions
2. Long term storage of material on an offline storage medium.
3. Archive copy is a master copy intended solely for storage and not to be used in distribution.
artifact
Noticeable loss of video and/or audio fidelity in a broadcast or recording caused by limitations in the technology used. Usually reflects undesirable distortion(s) of the original when digitized.
ARC
Aspect ratio conversion
Changing the original aspect ratio of a HD picture through downconversion to either 16:9 letterbox or 4:3 center cut (see Center Cut). Also general term for converting original 4:3 / 14:9 material into 16:9 by zooming in whilst maintaining the aspect ratio, typically to allow the seamless insertion of archive footage into modern 16:9 productions.
ascertainment
Historic term for the process of community consultation required by the Federal Communications Commission of U.S. broadcasters. Ascertainment was intended to help a broadcaster determine the needs and concerns of the community being served.
ASI
Asynchronous serial interface: A streaming data format which often carries an MPEG transport stream (MPEG-TS).
Aspect ratio
The ratio between the width and the height of the picture. In NTSC and PAL television sets, this is 4:3; in widescreen (ATSC, DVB, DTMB, and ISDB) sets, 16:9. Sometimes it is printed decimally as 1.33:1 for 4:3 and 1.78:1 for 16:9.
Aston
(primarily UK) A synonym for lower thirds, the graphics on the bottom part of a television screen. An on-screen overlaid graphic, usually giving the name of the speaker, reporter or place in frame. Name derived from Aston Broadcast Systems Ltd., an early manufacturer of character generator (CG) equipment.
ATR
Audio tape recorder: A method of recording sound by electromagnetic pulses on a sensitised plastic strip.
ATSC
Advanced Television Systems Committee: A committee established by the FCC to decide the technical standards for digital broadcasting in the US. See also ATSC 3.0, its third-generation digital standard.
AQH
Average Quarter Hour: A form of audience measurement used by Arbitron, defined as the number of persons listening to a particular station for at least five minutes during a quarter hour. Typical audience measurements may be in the order of ten thousand for the larger shows. (e.g. Jerry Springer scored 1,600 in the 12+ age group in the spring 2005 figures. Rush Limbaugh scored 16,400 in the same report)

== B ==
backhaul
Typically a raw broadcast signal direct from a remote site that is devoid of program graphics or studio segments (see fronthaul)
backsell
The technique where the DJ announces the song title and/or artist of the song that has just played. Also known as "back announcing".
backtiming
Where the DJ calculates the intro time on the song in an attempt to talk over the intro of the song and finish just prior to the vocals commencing. Frequently referred to as 'Hitting the Post' or 'Talking Up the Song' In the case where a piece of music or theme is intended to end at the end of a program, the start of that music is backtimed for its ending to match the end of the program. This music is usually started silently and faded up for the credits.
bandwidth
The available space between two given points on the electromagnetic spectrum and, inter alia, the amount of information that can be squeezed into that space.
BBC
British Broadcasting Corporation: The main public service broadcaster in the United Kingdom, founded as the British Broadcasting Company in 1922.
bed
A production element, usually instrumental music or sound effect played in the background of a spoken commercial, promo or other announcement.
bias
A constant amplitude high frequency signal added to the recording signal to improve the signal-to-noise ratio and reduce the distortion of an analog tape recording. It works by overcoming magnetic hysteresis.
billboard
A short announcement to identify a sponsor at the beginning or end of a production element such as the news or traffic/weather reports.
BITC
Burnt-In Time Code: pronounced bit-see. A permanently visible (as opposed to VITC) clock counter superimposed over a video picture, typically showing duration in hours, minutes, seconds and frames.
Black Clipping Circuit
An analog video control circuit that clips the black level signal from Black Encoded content prior to presentation. Historically used in analog TV broadcasts to prepare the video signal just prior to transmission. The presence of this signal in analog masters of classic television shows and the lack of this circuit, or an equivalent filter, in digital conversion explains the presence of this encoded data in various content on Netflix, Hulu, and other digital content providers. Failing to leverage this encoded data also explains the poor color reproduction present in some cases.
Black Encoded
Refers to analog tv video content in which the video signal of black (7.5 IRE units) has been overlaid on the top or bottom edge of the frame and recorded or merged for broadcast.
BTA
Black to Air
book
A rating period, particularly in radio.
break-bumper
An animation or logotype briefly shown after the end of a program or part of a program before the advertising. See also "optical".
breakfiller
An animation shown during the middle of a commercial break to provide relevant graphic information accompanied by backing music, usually only taking up no more than two minutes. On news channels, breakfiller content usually includes news excerpts, weather, stock market indices, current time(s) and/or schedules.
Breaking news
Interruptions of regular or planned programming for recently-occurring events as reported by a news organization or agency.
Broadcast clock

A broadcast clock is a diagram produced by a program director or a producer to illustrate where each programming element appears in a typical hour.
broadcast license

Authorization for a radio or television station within their respective country to operate, usually with specifications and restrictions on power input, antenna placement, interference mitigation, and in some cases, the specific hours a station can operate.
b-roll
Video used to illustrate a story.
Bug

bump
bumper
An element that acts as a transition to or from commercial breaks
bumper music
A pre-recorded production element containing voice-over and/or music that acts as a transition to or from commercial breaks.
Bulletin

1. A specific interruption of regularly scheduled programming for coverage of a major news event.
2. A regularly scheduled radio or television newscast.
BVOD
Broadcaster video on demand: a free streaming service featuring video content from a traditional television broadcaster.

== C ==
call letters
call sign
A legal identifier assigned to a broadcast station by its national broadcast regulator. Not all countries assign call signs.
cans
Slang for headphones.
CBC
The Canadian Broadcasting Corporation, a federal Crown corporation that is Canada's national public service broadcaster.
1. The English-language CBC Radio One, CBC Music (radio) and CBC Television (television).
2. The French-language Ici Radio-Canada Première, Ici Musique (radio) and Ici Radio-Canada Télé (television).
CBS
1. CBS, a major television network in the United States originally known as the "Columbia Broadcasting System". Operators of radio network CBS News Radio and former owners of CBS Radio (a now-defunct radio station holding company).
2. The Christian Broadcasting System (Korean: 기독교방송), a religious broadcasting service in South Korea.
3. Central Broadcasting System, state broadcaster for the Republic of China (Taiwan). Its international service, Radio Taiwan International (Chinese: 中央廣播電台; pinyin: Zhōngyāng Guǎngbò Diàntái) is relayed into Mainland China over shortwave transmitters.
CCIR
Comité consultatif international pour la radio: In English, "International Radio Consultative Committee," the organisation responsible for assigning frequencies to radio stations between 1927 and 1992. Now known as ITU-R.
CCTV
1. Closed-circuit television: Dissemination of television pictures within a given premises without being openly broadcast.
2. China Central Television (Chinese: 中国中央电视台; pinyin: Zhōngguó Zhōngyāng Diànshìtái): The state broadcaster of China.
Channel

1. A frequency designation for use by a radio or television station by a broadcasting regulator. More commonly associated with television, see television channel.
2. A common brand for a television station or said station's respective news service (ex: Channel 4 (disambiguation) and Channel Four News).
3. ITV Channel Television, originally "Channel Television" or "Channel", an ITV franchise originating from Jersey, Channel Islands.
channel sharing
(US) An agreement by which two or more separately licensed television stations are broadcast on the same multiplex.
Chyron
(primarily US) A synonym for lower thirds, the graphics on the bottom part of a television screen. An on-screen overlaid graphic, usually giving the name of the speaker, reporter or place in frame. Name derived from Chyron Corporation, an early manufacturer of character generator (CG) equipment.
City of license

(North America) A city or town designation for a radio or television station by the terms of its broadcast license, e.g., "licensed to serve". In the United States, used in conjunction with a radio or television station's call sign for a station identification at regular intervals.
class
A type of classification system for broadcast radio stations based on their technical parameters, used primarily in North and South America. See List of North American broadcast station classes.
clear-channel station

(North America) A former definition for high-powered AM stations with the maximum protection from interference by other stations that use the same frequency, arranged by international treaty. Defined by the FCC as Class I-A stations, this was retired in favor of Class A status in the 1980s.
Clear Channel Communications
A major radio station ownership group in the United States from 1975 to 2014, named after the AM station designation. Renamed as iHeartMedia in 2014.
clearance
Airing of programs, particularly in the context of programs on individual stations. From "time clearance".
Closed captioning
Text version of a program's dialogue overlaid on the screen by an equipped television set for people with hearing impairment.
closing billboard (CBB)
A title card of the program that is shown after the credits, marking the end of a show.
clutter
An excessive number of non-program elements (such as commercials) appearing one after another.
CNN
The abbreviation for "Cable News Network", a news agency based out of New York City and Atlanta, Georgia, United States, with multiple international news bureaus. Owned by Warner Bros. Discovery.
Cold open

A part of a program played before the title sequence, usually featuring a cliffhanger or prefiguring the plot of the episode to follow.
comparative hearing
The process by which the United States Federal Communications Commission determined which of several mutually exclusive applications—for instance, for the same radio frequency or TV channel in a given area—to grant. Abandoned in the 1990s.
CONELRAD
"Control of Electromagnetic Radiation", an early method for emergency broadcasting to the general public in the United States from 1951 to 1963, maintained by the Federal Civil Defense Administration. Upon activation, all FM and TV stations, and most AM stations, were required to shut down, with the remaining AM stations to rotate between transmitting at 640 kHz or 1240 kHz on a round-robin basis, in order to confuse enemy aircraft relying on radio direction finding. Precursor to the Emergency Broadcast System.
copy
Written material to be read by a DJ or presenter.
Countdown
A bumper which counts down to the beginning of the following broadcast or news event. Also used for the debut of a new channel.
coverage
The percentage of households that can tune into a radio station within the theoretical broadcast radius.
crash
When an announcement, jingle or graphic overlaps with a fixed point in the schedule (e.g., the news or a time signal), usually due to poor timing.
crossfade
The technique where a DJ, producer or engineer fades out the outgoing track at the same time as fading in the new track.
cross conversion
Changing scan rates for synchronicity within a broadcast plant. Typically done by converting between 480i/p 720p, 1080i/p, and 2160 4k.

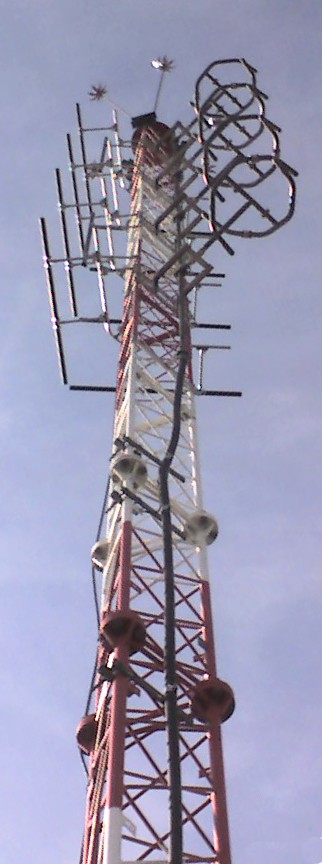
WRUW-FM's antenna, with crossed-dipole antennas at right. Their resemblance to a turnstile gives them the nickname "turnstile antenna".

crossed-dipole antenna

A radio antenna with two identical dipole antennas mounted at right angles to each other and fed in phase quadrature, resulting in the two currents applied being 90 degrees out of phase. Nicknamed a "turnstile antenna" as the antenna resembles a turnstile when viewed horizontally. Commonly used in FM broadcasting.
CRTC
Canadian Radio-television and Telecommunications Commission: The regulator of broadcasting and communications in Canada.
cueing
cue
Determining a desired playback point for recorded audio or visual material. Commonly associated in radio broadcasting with setting a recorded piece of music for future playback, which can be determined via off-air means, but is also utilized in television broadcasting and live music events. The intended effect is to prevent dead air from being broadcast.
cue burn
An effect of the back and forth movement of a record turntable when a DJ was cueing tracks for future airplay. The cartridge of the player would rub the vinyl and damage the records creating a characteristic noise.
cue dot
A small square inserted in the corner of the picture to inform rebroadcasters that an advertisement break is about to happen. In the UK, this appeared exactly one minute before the break and disappeared 55 seconds later.
cue channel
In the early days of networks a dedicated multi-drop phone line connected all affiliated station engineers to the network Master Control. The system was backed up with teletype too.
cue track
A recorded audio track containing information about upcoming events that an operating engineer would need to know. It was first used by Thomas Edison on his first talking pictures using records for the sound playback. He used the information to synchronize picture and sound. On early soundtrack records, the introduction of a "beep tone" was used to tell the operator to turn on and off the auditorium speakers so the audience would not hear the cue information. Cue tracks were adopted in the early days of Kinescope to cue the film chain engineer, later used in early Ampex Quad Tape systems and is still used today either as voice or digitally for station automation systems. In the early days of bicycled programs cue tracks along with a printed timeline was used to inform the engineer of breaks or jam (insert) spots in the tape including a 5-second countdown to the break-in and out locations. Because the program tape or film never stopped, often the original recording engineer would add comments of his own regarding the program, sometimes humorous. When smaller networks supported independent stations, programs were assembled with the cue track often containing the voices of the original and assembling engineers.
Cue tone
Used to prompt insertion of a local TV commercial or radio advertisement by the broadcast automation equipment at the broadcast station or cable headend.
Cume
Short for cumulative audience, a similar measurement for a newspaper or magazines' circulation figures.
CW, The
A major television network in the United States, formed in 2006 as a merger between UPN (owned by CBS Corporation) and The WB (owned by TimeWarner). Currently jointly owned by successor companies Paramount Skydance and Warner Bros. Discovery with a pending purchase of majority control by Nexstar Media Group.

== D ==
DAB
Digital Audio Broadcasting: The use of digital encoding to send higher quality or a greater number of radio services to equipped receivers.
DAC
Digital-to-analog converter: Equipment that changes digital signals into pictures or sound.
Dayparting
The radio station's broadcast programming day is normally split up (starting at 6 am) into a series of 4 hour sessions containing one or more shows. In radio broadcasting, the term is usually used to refer to the practice of pushing certain songs to a later or earlier listening time (such as more adult-oriented content to a later hour).
daytimer
(North America) An AM station required to suspend all operations during nighttime hours if they operate on a frequency assigned to a high-powered Class A station. See clear-channel station.
dB
Decibel
A measure of voltage, current or power gain.
DBS
Direct-broadcast satellite: Television and radio programs distributed by satellite for reception via a dish at the receiver's property.
DD
Doordarshan, the Indian public television broadcaster.
Dead air
The time on-air where there is no audible transmission. This silence can be down to any of the following:

- DJ, Producer or Engineer error
- Equipment error or failure
- Act of God
- Deliberate silence for remembrance.

deintermixture
(historical, United States) The reallocation of television frequencies such that an area would only have VHF or UHF television stations. As UHF stations suffered from severe economic disadvantages to VHF stations in the early years of television, numerous proposals were made to separate VHF and UHF cities, thereby ensuring fair competition in a given market.
diginet
Digital multicast television network: A type of national television service designed to be broadcast as a secondary channel by existing TV stations.
dipole antenna
A class of antennas commonly consisting of two identical conductive elements (ex., metal wires or rods). Currents or output signals applied by a transmitter are divided between the two halves of the antenna, which in turn produces radio waves. Can be used for resonant antennas, radar altimeters or for broadcasting. Regarded as the simplest type of antenna from a theoretical point of view.
DJ
Disc Jockey: A radio presenter who links records.
DMA
Designated Market Area: In the United States, a group of counties or parts of counties that share a group of television stations. DMAs are defined by Nielsen Media Research and are referenced by several federal regulations. There are 210 DMAs in the United States.
DOG

Digital on-screen graphic: A common practice of displaying on-screen the logo of a television station, a network, a sponsoring company or the program itself. Commonly referred to as a "bug" because it looks like an insect is hanging out in the corner of the screen, typically as a translucent image in the right hand bottom corner. Controversial due to "screenburn" issues, found to be distracting, among other reasons.
Dolby Digital
Also Dolby D. The standard for 5.1 channel (surround sound) audio. Six discrete channels are used (Left, Center, Right, Left Rear Surround, Right Rear Surround, and Subwoofer).
double pumping
Putting out two episodes of a show back-to-back, either to boost ratings in a given slot or to burn off episodes of a cancelled show.
drive time
Drive time refers to the period of time where the majority of radio listeners travel to or from work (i.e. rush hour). This is traditionally 6–10 am and 2–6 pm, and is normally accompanied by radio stations' highest listenership. Commercials are normally more expensive during such times.
down-stream keyer
Part of a vision mixer used for compositing by removing part of one video signal (the "key") and adding in another video signal (the "fill").
dropping the light
Lowering the light levels. "Drop the light" is often yelled while shooting when the director wants to continue shooting the action of the scene after the light levels are lowered. It has nothing to do with any physical dropping of a lighting fixture during the scene.
drops
These are excerpts of TV, movies and other audio programs that are used to accentuate programming.
drop song
1. Temporary unselecting a playlist song to better accommodate an accurate clock hour.
2. A song scheduled on a radio station but not played for timing reasons.
DSNG
Digital Satellite news gathering: Use of digital satellite transmission from remote broadcast locations for the purpose of live television news event coverage.
DTH
Direct to Home: Television and radio programs distributed by satellite for reception via a dish at the receiver's property.
DTMB
Digital Terrestrial Multimedia Broadcast: Digital television transmission standard developed in the People's Republic of China.
DTT
Digital terrestrial television: Digital broadcast of television signals over the air.
DVB
Digital Video Broadcasting: A standard of digital television transmission and reception. Comes in variants according to the type of broadcast, e.g. DVB-T for terrestrial.

== E ==
E/I

Shorthand for "educational and informative", part of a series of regulations on children's television programming in the United States.
EAS
Emergency Alert System: An emergency warning system used in the United States.
EBS
1. Educational Broadcasting System: A public broadcaster in South Korea.
2. Emergency Broadcast System: A former emergency warning system used in the United States.
EBU
European Broadcasting Union: An alliance of public service broadcasting entities, mostly in Europe.
eFM
The FM extended band in Brazil, 76.1–87.3 MHz.
ENACOM
The Ente Nacional de Comunicaciones (National Communications Entity), regulator of broadcasting in Argentina.
encryption
The scrambling of a signal to allow reception via a decoder only by specific viewers, e.g. after the payment of a fee.
ERP
Effective radiated power: A standardized definition of directional radio frequency (RF) power used in VHF and UHF broadcasting, including FM radio and television.
ESPN
The flagship network of six basic cable television channels, four college athletics channels and a streaming video service based out of Bristol, Connecticut, United States, focused on live sport coverage and analysis. Formerly an abbreviation for "Entertainment and Sports Programming Network". Jointly owned by The Walt Disney Company and Hearst Communications. See also: ESPN Radio and The Sports Network.

== F ==
fader
See pot.
FAST
Free ad-supported streaming television, a type of linear streaming-only TV service.
fax
Abbreviation of “facilities check”; a diagnostic process of ensuring all video and audio sources are properly connected and configured throughout all production equipment prior to a broadcasting or recording event. Sometimes spelled facs.
feedback
A loud noise produced when the amplified sound from an output (loudspeaker) is picked up by an input (microphone, phonograph) feeding that loudspeaker. This can be potentially damaging to both the speaker(s) in question, as well as the hearing of the subjected listener. This may also occur when an input is directly patched into an output of the same device, usually due to operator error.
In radio broadcasting, feedback may occur when a DJ increases his or her headphone volume to a high enough level that the microphone is able to pick up the sound coming from the headphones, usually when the DJ's head is turned to one side.
FCC
Federal Communications Commission: The regulator of broadcasting and communications in the United States.
Format clock

Fox
Shorthand for the Fox Broadcasting Company, a major television network in the United States.
Fox News

A news service based out of New York, New York, United States, with multiple international bureaus and features punditry programming with a largely conservative slant. Owned by Fox Corporation.
FPS
frames per second
The number of times the television is refreshed in a second of time. As a rule of thumb, this is the same as the frequency of the local alternating current electricity supply – 60 Hz or 50 Hz.
FRC
frame rate conversion
A technology to synchronize and change frame rates between two formats (ie: film to video, PAL to NTSC, 50 Hz to 60 Hz. etc..)
Frequency

The number of occurrences of a repeating event per unit of time.
Frequency modulation

A modulation technique used in electronic communication where the instantaneous frequency of the wave is varied, with the instantaneous frequency deviation having a functional relation to the modulating signal amplitude. Invented by Edwin Howard Armstrong, this technique is most commonly used for transmitting an audio signal via a radio wave measured in megahertz (MHz). See FM broadcasting.
fronthaul
A broadcast video feed that is complete with graphics, commercials, interstitials and studio integration. This typically originates from a master control room and is delivered to a distributor or over-the-air (also see backhaul)
front sell
The act of introducing a song about to be played.

== G ==
gain
A change in signal level, usually expressed in decibels.
gallery
Also known as the production control room or the studio control room. Where the composition of the outgoing program takes place.
genlock
Distributing a reference signal to multiple video devices in order to make them operate at the same frequency.
Gigahertz (GHz)
Thousand million cycles per second. Used electromagnetically to measure satellite frequencies.

== H ==
HAAT
Height above average terrain: A calculation of the variance in height between a VHF or UHF broadcasting antenna and the surrounding terrain.
hammocking
Placing a new or poorly-performing program between two established popular programs in order to boost viewing figures.
HBO
"Home Box Office", a pay television channel in the United States centered on theatrically released motion pictures, original television programs, made-for-cable movies, documentaries, sports coverage, comedy and concert specials. The flagship of seven multiplex channels, a traditional subscription video on demand platform and streaming video service HBO Max. Owned by Warner Bros. Discovery.
HDTV
High-definition television: Broadcasting using a line standard of 720 or greater. Prior to World War II, high definition meant a line standard greater than 240 lines.

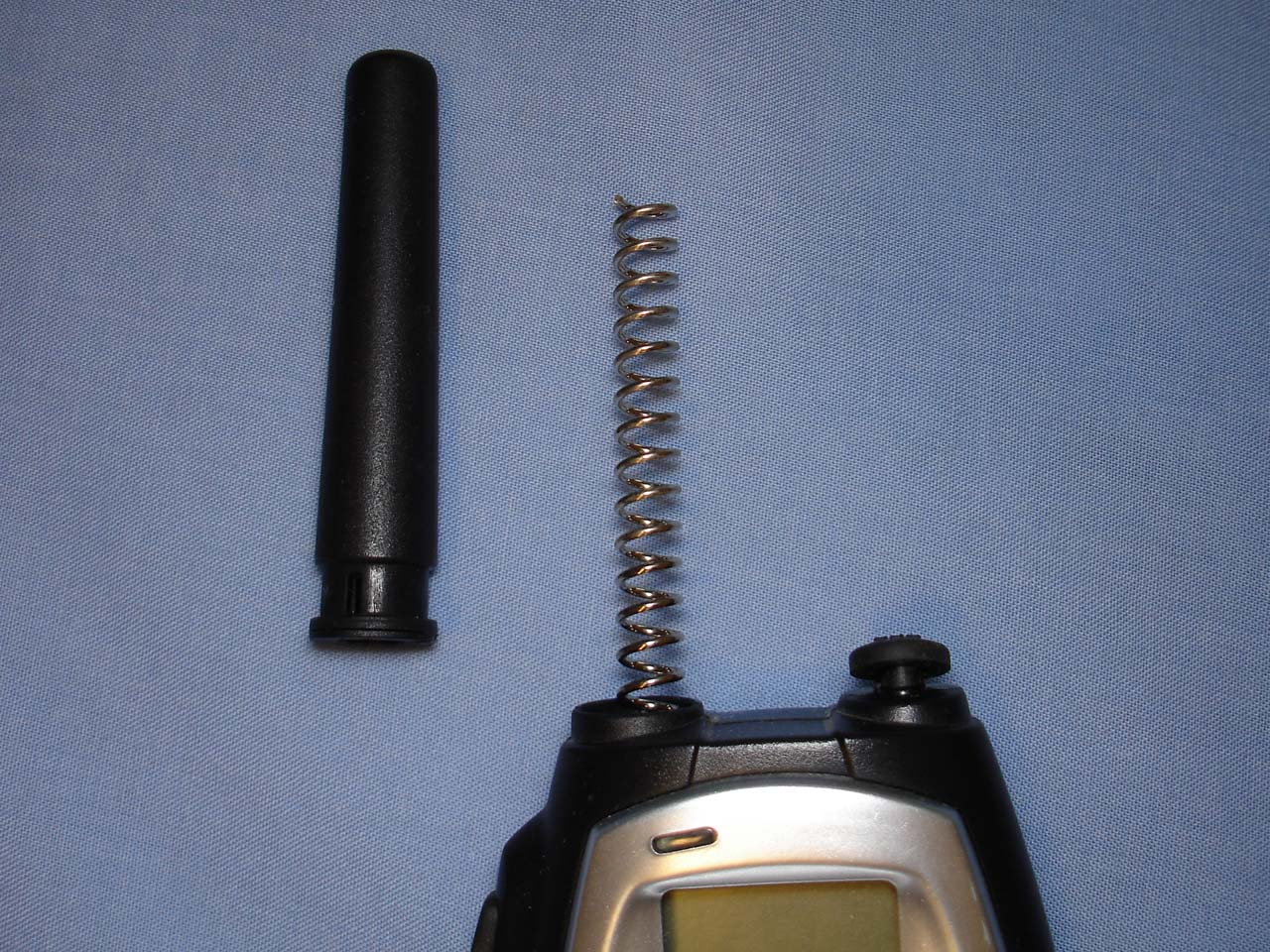
A CB radio with an exposed helical "rubber ducky" antenna.

helical antenna
A radio antenna with one or more conductive wires, wound up in the shape of a helix. A version of this is utilized for both FM and UHF broadcasting, while an axial mode helical antenna is commonly used for satellite communication. Also known as the "rubber ducky antenna" used in two way radio.
HEVC
High Efficiency Video Coding (also known as H.265), a video codec.
hit the post
A DJ talking right up to the point where the vocals of a song commence hits the post.

== I ==
ident
A station's symbol or logo, often accompanied by music, a jingle or an animation.
image liner
A short audio clip played frequently on a radio station between songs and ads to identify the station that is being aired, i.e. the station's name, call letters, or positioning statement.
IFT
Spanish: Instituto Federal de Telecomunicaciones
The Federal Telecommunications Institute, primary regulator of broadcasting in Mexico.
In-band on-channel
A hybrid method of encoding an analog signal and a digital signal on the same frequency. Also referred to as IBOC. Utilized in North American radio for the proprietary HD Radio standard.
Independent station

1. A radio or television station generally not linked to a major network.
2. (U.S., Canada and Mexico) A television station not affiliated with any of the main broadcast networks.
ITU
International Telecommunication Union: Originally the International Telegraph Union, the ITU is the international organization established in 1865 to standardize and regulate international radio and telecommunications.
iTV
interactive television
Systems that allow viewers to interact (e.g. play games, shop for related items or find further information) either two-way, via a telephone line, or one-way, via MHEG graphics.
ITV
1. "Independent Television", a major commercial television network in the United Kingdom.
2. A public limited company of the same name that owns and operates most of the network's current franchises.

== J ==
jingle
A produced programming element usually in the form of vocals to accompanying music often produced in-house to identify the show, DJ or the station.

== K ==
kilohertz (kHz)

Thousand cycles per second. Used electromagnetically to measure medium wave and short wave frequencies.
KBP
Filipino: Kapisanan ng mga Brodkaster ng Pilipinas, the trade association of commercial broadcasters in the Philippines.

== L ==
legal ID
In the United States, the station identification consisting of the station call letters followed by the community of license. Given as close as practical to the top of the hour at a natural break in program offerings.
letterbox

The appearance of black bars at the top and bottom of a picture when 16:9 or 14:9 widescreen material is shown on 4:3 sets.
lighthouse
In ATSC 3.0, a station designated to serve as the primary broadcaster of ATSC 3.0 transmissions on behalf of multiple stations.
liner
A piece of written text that the DJ says over the intro of a song or between spots and songs. Liners are designed to invoke the imagination.
line standard
The number of lines broadcast to make up a television picture. Generally, 525 in NTSC areas and 625 elsewhere in PAL/SECAM areas.
live
Any programming which is broadcast immediately as it is being delivered (a live report); performed (a live concert or show); or captured (live news or sports coverage). Requires an unbroken communications chain without any intervening recording or storage technology. Considered the most exciting form of broadcasting, delivered “as it happens”.
live on tape
live-to-tape
A recorded program produced in real time, usually with a studio audience, for later broadcast. Requires precisely timed pauses for insertion of station breaks and commercials at time of broadcast. Typically employed for network broadcast across multiple time zones. Also applies to live broadcasting which is simultaneously recorded for rebroadcast at a later time or date.
LKFS
A newly introduced audio measurement tool that measure loudness, k-weighted, relative to full scale (or LKFS) is a loudness standard designed to enable normalization of audio levels for delivery of broadcast TV and other video. It typically is measured over time and not as immediate peak readings. LKFS is standardized in ITU-R BS.1770.
LMA
Local marketing agreement: (U.S.) A type of management agreement in which one entity assumes most of the operational functions of a broadcast station owned by another. Less comprehensive agreements include the joint sales agreement (JSA) and shared services agreement (SSA).
log

A written record of broadcasting. There are typically three logs:
1. A music log recording what songs were played, typically used with radio stations.
2. An engineer's log detailing technical production settings.
A commercial log recording which commercials were played during the day.
lower third
Portion of screen of regular broadcast reserved for textual and static visual content; i.e., news ticker, time, title of segment, title of program, channel bug, etc. Upper third has sometimes been used alongside lower third, as in the case of MSNBC since 2010.

== M ==
Macrovision
A trademarked system designed to prevent unauthorized copying of video material.

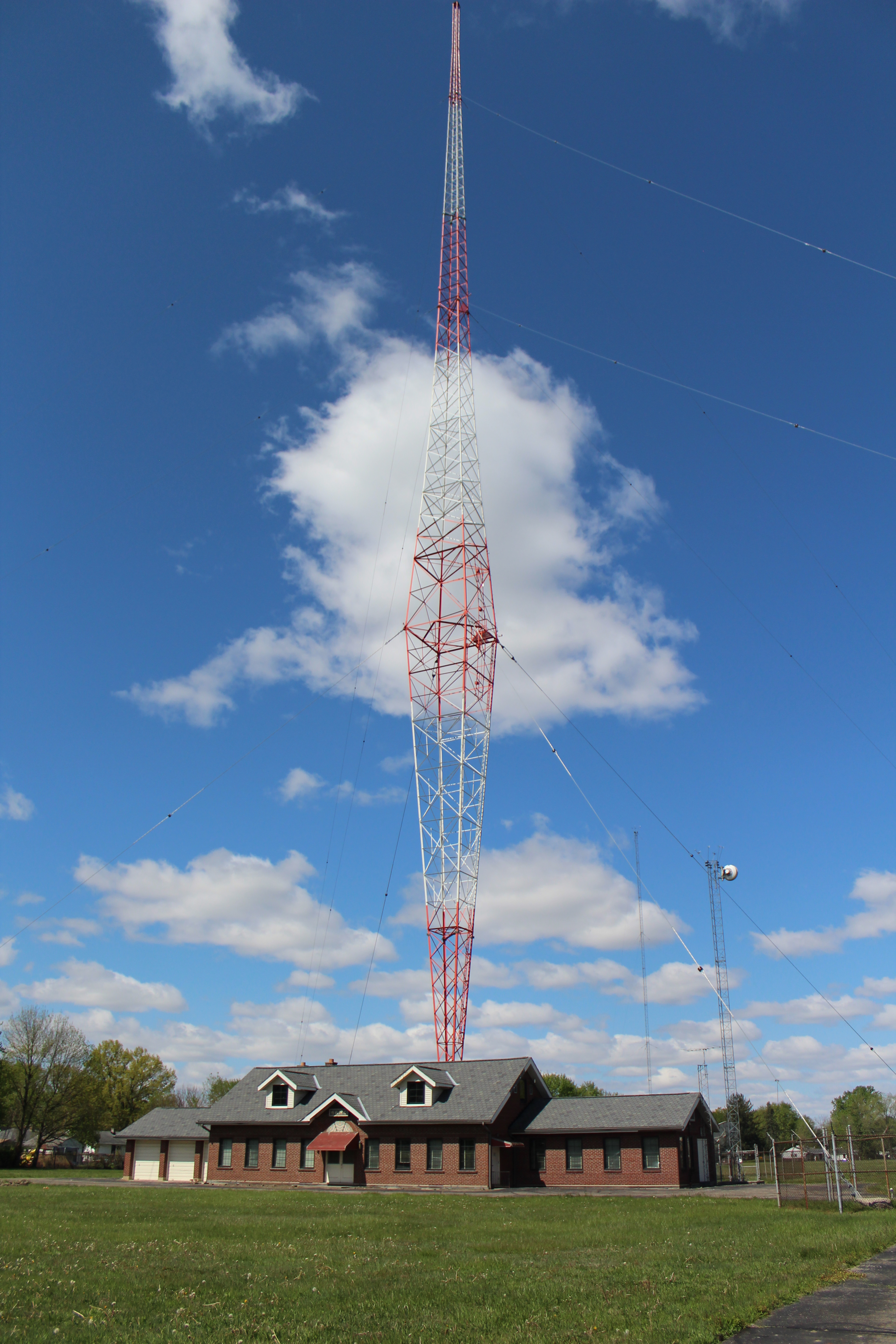
A Blaw-Knox mast radiator used by WBNS radio.

mast radiator
A monopole antenna, commonly a conductive steel guyed mast, that is energized and functions as an antenna. Used for medium wave AM stations, the mast is connected electrically to a transmitter and mounted to insulate it from the ground. Can also be a freestanding lattice tower. A few of these towers, constructed by Blaw-Knox, are known for their distinctive diamond shape.
master clock
A signal generator that outputs timecode and reference video for genlocking. May output word clock as well.
Medium wave

A specific spectrum of the medium frequency (MF) radio band allocated for AM radio broadcasting.
Megahertz (MHz)

Million cycles per second. Used electromagnetically to measure FM broadcasts and television.
miscue
A mistake by the DJ or production engineer resulting in two audio elements being played at the same time, e.g. an interview and the next song.
monopole antenna
Marconi antenna
Invented by Guglielmo Marconi. A rod-shaped conductor typically mounted perpendicularly over a conductive ground plane surface, which emits radio waves when connected to a transmitter.
MTV
1. MTV, a pay television cable channel in the United States. Originally an abbreviation for "Music Television" and launched in 1981 with an all-music videos lineup.
2. MTV (Hungarian: Magyar Televízió, "Hungarian Television"), a public television broadcaster in Hungary.
multichannel
(Australia) A secondary channel from an existing major broadcaster. See Digital multicast television network.
Mutual Broadcasting System

A former major radio network in the United States established in 1934 as a cooperative among affiliate stations.

== N ==
NAB
National Association of Broadcasters, the U.S. trade association of commercial broadcasters.
nat/VO
Video only with natural sound: (Television news) Video with natural sound played at full volume intended to be accompanied by a news correspondent reading a news story.
NBC
1. NBC, an abbreviation for the National Broadcasting Company, a major television network in the United States.
2. Two former radio networks in the United States: NBC Red (later the NBC Radio Network) and NBC Blue (later the Blue Network).
3. NBC PNG, Papua New Guinea's state-owned broadcaster.
4. The Namibian Broadcasting Corporation (Afrikaans: Namibiese Uitsaai-Korporasie), the public broadcaster of Namibia.
5. Nation Broadcasting Corporation, a major radio and TV network in the Philippines.
6. The Norwegian Broadcasting Corporation, (Norwegian: Norsk rikskringkasting AS), the public broadcaster of Norway.
7. "Newfoundland Broadcasting Company", a former on-air brand for (and the current ownership of) CJON-DT in St. John's, Newfoundland and Labrador, Canada.
Network

A system which distributes programming to multiple stations simultaneously, or slightly delayed, for the purpose of extending total broadcast coverage beyond the limits of a single radio or television signal.
1. Television network, distributing television program content.
2. Radio network, either for distributing audio content to a chain of radio stations or a means of direct two-way communication.
3. News network, a form of broadcast journalism either in radio, television or the internet.
NEMO
(historical, United States) Not Emanating Main Office: An early term used in remote broadcast operations. It was often used to refer to the remote lines that fed live programming from dance halls, ballrooms, clubs and sporting events to the station's master control.
News ticker

A scrolling ticker at the bottom of the display of television content. It is usually reserved for text headlines or numeric statistics (or both) depending upon the focus of the channel.
Nielsen ratings
Survey of US viewers by the AC Nielsen Company to establish the audiences for individual programs and their demographics.
Non-commercial educational station (NCE)

A radio or television station in the United States that does not accept any on-air advertising. Some early NCE stations were founded as extensions of area universities or school districts and offered (and in some cases, still offer) in-school educational programming.
NPR
National Public Radio: The main public radio service in the United States and operators of a news agency of the same name.
NTSC
National Television System Committee: An American committee formed to set the line standard and later color standard for broadcasting. Gave its name to the method of color reproduction used in the Americas (except Brazil) and in Japan.

== O ==
Ofcom
Office of Communications
The regulator of broadcasting and communications in the United Kingdom. Successor to the Independent Television Commission.
optical
Generically, any on-screen graphic. Specifically, a graphic inserted between a program and an advertisement or between individual advertisements.
OOV
Out Of Vision
A stage instruction noting that a character is not seen when speaking. Also, in continuity announcing, the practice of speaking over a caption rather than appearing on screen.
opening billboard (OBB)
A title card of the program that is shown when the show starts.
Opt-out
Regional variation or deviation from the network programme.
OB
Outside broadcast. A complete event or programme, or a brief news report, produced and fed back live from the location by an OB vehicle to the broadcaster.
OTT
Over-the-top content. Term used for the delivery of film and TV content via the internet.
O&O
Owned-and-operated station
A local television station owned and operated by the network it broadcasts, particularly in countries where television networks maintain regional affiliate partnerships.

== P ==
PAL
Phase Alternating Line: Television broadcast system used in Europe and Australia & New Zealand, also parts of Asia, Africa and South America.
PASB
Program As Broadcast: A BBC term for a (supposedly contemporaneous) log of a channel's output – also a video (or film) recording of an individual live program.
pay-per-view
Reception of a scrambled film or sporting event after the payment of a one-off fee for that broadcast.
PBS
The Public Broadcasting Service, a programming service for non-commercial television stations in the United States.
PGF
Pink and Green Flashing
The erroneous effect of pink and green flashing on a video signal usually caused by a disturbance to the SDI input/output of broadcast equipment.
PIF
Public information film: A government-produced commercial, usually shown for free, giving safety information or advice.
pillarbox
The appearance of blank bars on either side of the picture when 4:3 material is shown on a 16:9 widescreen television set.
Pilot
A one-off episode of a proposed series, usually in extended form, to gauge audience reaction. If successful, the rest of the series is made and the pilot becomes the first episode.
pips
Slang term for the time signal broadcast by some radio stations at the top of the hour.
Pirate Radio

1. A radio or television station that operates without legal authorization by their respective country's broadcasting regulator. Depending on the country, said regulators can enforce penalties on the operators and confiscate equipment. In the United Kingdom, stations like Radio Caroline and Radio Atlanta proliferated in the 1960s via offshore transmissions as a challenge to the BBC's monopoly on radio broadcasting.
2. A brand used by Los Angeles radio station KQLZ from 1989 to 1992. Although KQLZ was legally licensed, the station marketed itself as an "illegal broadcast" that took over the previous format.
playlist
The official songs that a radio station will play during a given week. The playlist is not usually chosen by the DJ.
playout
The transmission of radio or TV channels from the broadcaster into broadcast networks that deliver content to the audience.
PMD
PM drive time: The evening rush hour slot.

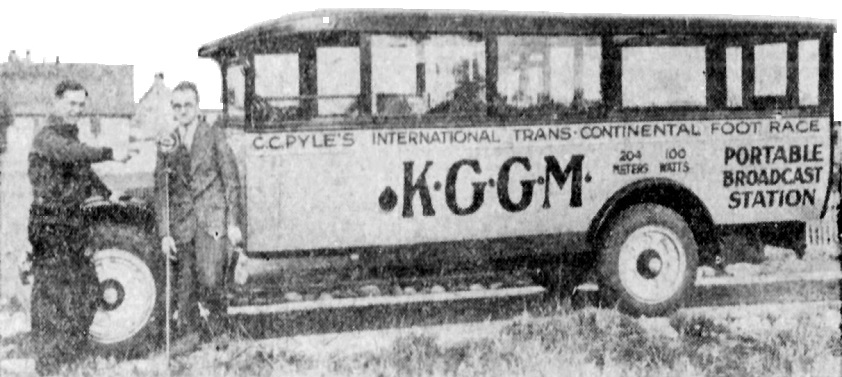
Portable broadcast station KGGM in operation during the 1928 Trans-American Footrace.

portable broadcasting station
Radio stations in the United States which were not restricted to operate in a specific community (i.e., a city of license), but could be transported to various locations. Originally instituted by the U.S. Department of Commerce in 1922, this classification was ended in 1928 by the Federal Radio Commission.
positioning statement
A radio station's mission statement or vision statement. A one to two sentence statement that conveys what you do for whom, to uniquely solve an urgent need. These are usually aired during Image Liners.
postage stamp
The appearance of a black border all around the picture, usually in error, when 4:3 material is converted to 16:9 and then back to 4:3 before broadcast.
pot
Potentiometer: A control for attenuating the level of a signal. Also used as a verb, as in "pot up" (increase volume, typically but not always from nothing) or "pot down" (lower volume, sometimes to nothing).

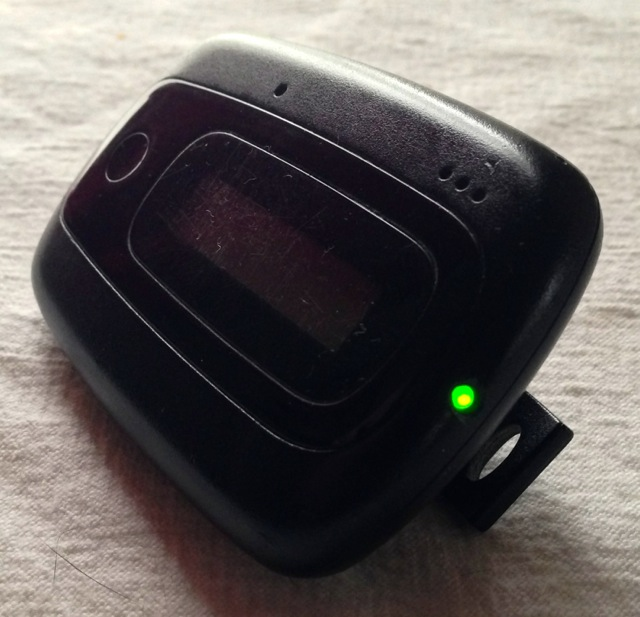
A Portable People Meter device.

PPM
Portable People Meter: A wearable device used in conjunction with inaudible tones embedded in the audio of a radio station or television channel to generate ratings information. Utilized by the ACNielsen Company for audience measurement of radio and television stations.
production element
A production element is a piece of audio that is used in the final audio mix. This may include commercials, music, sound effects, audio effects (e.g. echo) station id or program signatures or announcements.
producer
The person who performs or manages the day to day business operations of a station. Also the person responsible for an individual program – a radio producer or a television producer.
promo
An announcement (either recorded or live) used to promote the station's image or other event.
proxy file
Proxy Video is a form of metadata. It consists of highly compressed, very low resolution video (with sound) that mirrors a high resolution original master digital recording.
public broadcasting
public radio
public television

A form of electronic media outlets whose primary mission is public service. Usually funded by outside and diverse sources including licence fees, individual contributions, public financing and commercial financing. Can be operated on either a national level via a singular organization (e.g., the BBC), or on a local level via a network of affiliated stations.
PSA
Public service announcement: Produced for television or radio stations with intent to change the public interest by raising awareness of an issue, affecting public attitudes, and potentially stimulating action. Typically between 30 and 60 seconds in length.

== Q ==
quadraphonic
Sound reproduction utilizing four speakers. Now superseded by Dolby 5.1 Surround Sound.

== R ==
racks
Control panel where several television cameras are matched together by operator(s) for exposure, colour balance and black level.
A standard enclosure containing various broadcasting equipment, including servers, power supplies, networking, storage, transmission and computing equipment, as in a 19-inch rack.
Radio format

The description of programming and content broadcast over a radio station. Can be defined by genre, musical selections, or other thematic elements. Sometimes employed to reach a specific age group or demographic.
rating
The estimated percentage of all households or persons tuned to a specific station or channel. Contrast with share.
ramp
An intro to a piece of music.
reader
A story read by a presenter entirely on-camera (as opposed to a voice-over).
Regional sports network
In the United States, a pay television channel with a restricted distribution area that broadcasts sports programming from professional teams.
repack
A process by which television stations were cleared from blocks of spectrum to make way for other communications services. See 2016 United States wireless spectrum auction § Repacking.
RT
The abbreviation for "Russia Today", a state-owned news agency in Russia. Formerly operated multiple international news channels, including RT America, until distributors suspended their involvement following the 2022 Russian invasion of Ukraine.
rundown
run of show
A timed outline of a program.

== S ==
screenburn
Where a permanent mark is burnt into the mask of the TV screen due to prolonged display. Common with sets tuned to one channel for promotional purposes or on ordinary sets from DOGs inserted by broadcasters. Also known as Phosphor burn-in.
Simulcast

1. The broadcast of the same program from multiple transmitters.
2. Relaying the same programming from one television or radio station onto another station, or a series of stations, on a continuous basis.
3. When a broadcaster joins another feed typically produced by a third-party supplier outside their facility either live or in a prerecorded format. For example, a press conference or event that is simultaneously joined by various non-related broadcasters.
share
The estimated percentage of all households or persons actively listening to radio or television that are tuned to a specific station or channel. Contrast with rating.
SiriusXM

American satellite radio platform.
Sky News
1. Sky News, an international news service and pay television channel based out of London, England.
2. Sky News Australia, a pay television channel in Australia formerly under common ownership with the British Sky News.
slipmat
A slipmat was a mat that was placed on a record deck between the deck and the record. Normally made by the DJ, it was cut significantly oversized when compared to a vinyl record. The DJ would cue the record to the beginning of a song and then holding onto the mat would turn the turntable on whilst the record stayed at the beginning of the song. The DJ could then introduce the record and then release the mat onto the already spinning deck thus reducing the spin up speed to 33 or 45 rpm. The effect was to reduce the whirl effect produced by the turning on of the turntable.
Soundbite

A small portion (usually one or two sentences) of an audio recording (often an interview) used to illustrate a news story in the words of the interviewee (cf. a quotation from a politician).
Sponsorship
1. In the United States, the practice of a company funding the making of a program in order to entertain an audience and sell a product.
2. In the UK, an advertisement inserted between the end-of-part caption and the break-bumper.
spot
A radio, television commercial or underwriting spot
spot advertising
A commercial or commercials run in the middle of or between programs, sold separately from the program (as opposed to sponsors' messages).

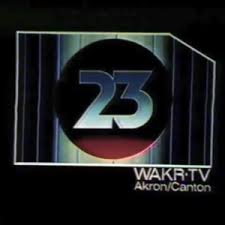
A station identification slide for WAKR-TV in Akron, Ohio (c. early 1980s).

Station identification

A procedure commonly used on radio and television stations in the United States in which the respective station's call sign and city of license is read aloud on radio and displayed visually on television (and in some instances, read aloud). Typically done on an hourly basis.
stop set
Or stopset. The slot in the schedule where commercials are played during a typical broadcast hour. There may be several scattered throughout a typical 60 minute period. Stop set length can vary much between local stations and even network programming.
sting
a visual and/or musical punctuation that signals a break between two sections of a program.

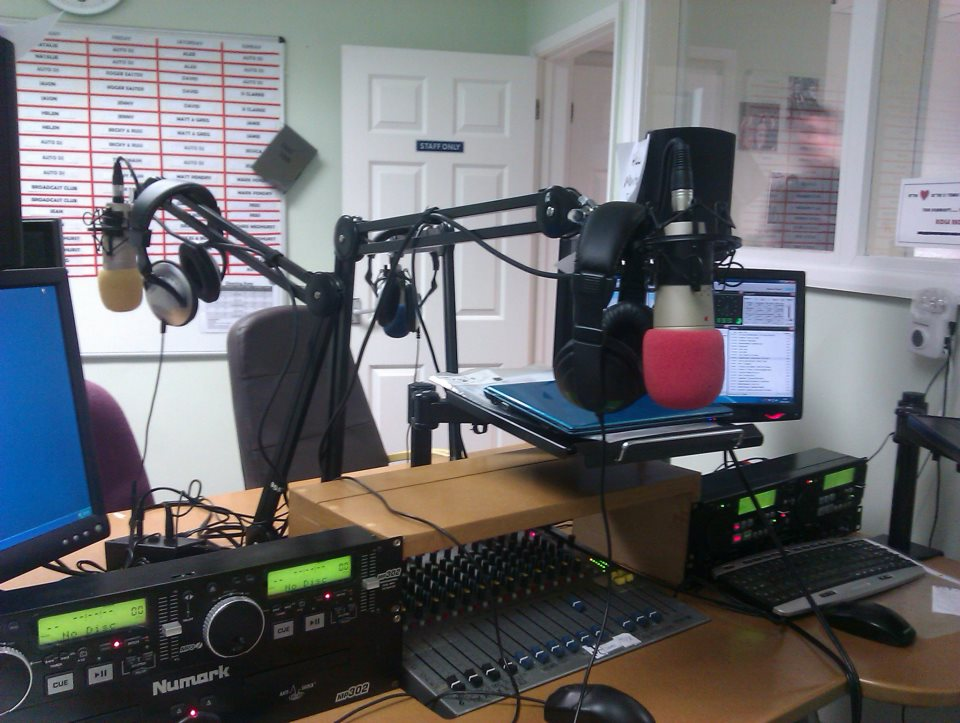
Studios for Ridge Radio, an internet radio station in Caterham, England.

studio

1. Recording studio: a specialized facility used for sound recording, mixing and audio production.
2. Radio studio: a room or series of rooms where a radio program or show is produced, either live or in pre-recorded form.
3. Television studio: a facility for television or video production which can be used for live television, recorded content either through analog video tape or digital tapeless means, or the assembly of raw footage via post-production.
Stunting
A publicity stunt performed by a radio station. Typically occurs during the interregnum between the end of one format and the beginning of another, featuring a series of songs or a continuous loop of a song, uncharacteristic of the previous format (ex., CKKS-FM in Vancouver looping "Killing in the Name" after dropping their Hot AC format, yielding international press coverage). Can also occur to engender awareness of an existing format or as an act of protest. Sometimes associated with Christmas music.
subscription television
STV
Technology used to broadcast encrypted signals to be decoded by equipment owned or leased by paid subscribers, as well as the programming services thereby broadcast.
subtitles
Text version of a program's dialogue, overlaid on the screen either at broadcast or at reception (often via Teletext or Closed Captioning) for the hearing impaired or for when a speaker is unclear or speaking in a foreign language.
Superstation
(North America) A television station retransmitted to an audience larger than its original city of license and media market via communications satellite or microwave relay to multichannel television providers (e.g., cable, direct broadcast satellite and IPTV services). WPCH-TV in Atlanta, originally under the WTCG call sign and later WTBS, became the best-known example of this in the late 1970s, with its programming eventually spun off into cable channel TBS.
SVOD
Subscription video on demand. A video/audio on demand service that uses a subscription model that requires users to pay a monthly fee to access a bundled set of content.
sweeps
A period, usually in February, May, July and November, where the ACNielsen Company undertakes audience measurement to record the Nielsen ratings of all television shows in all markets with all demographics. This allows networks and local stations to spot surprise hits and unexpected failures. It is also a time when a successful network will try pilot episodes of new shows, whilst a failing network will often put existing successful programs in place of poorly performing shows to boost average ratings.

== T ==
T-antenna

A monopole antenna consisting of one or more horizontal wires suspended between two supports and insulated from them at the ends, resulting in a "T" shape. These supports can either be a radio mast or a building. Developed as an outgrowth of wireless telegraphy, it is still typically used for shortwave transmissions, amateur radio, and some medium wave AM stations.
tape sync
An interview conducted by phone and recorded in both locations, with the two recordings to be mixed later.
teaser

teletext
Electronic information inserted into the unused parts of a television signal and decodable by an equipped television set.
tiling
The appearance of large non-congruent blocks on a video display when a digitally generated broadcast (i.e., image) was received by the monitor in an incomplete form. Tiling also occurs when the video signal has degraded or been partially interrupted as it was received by the monitor.
toss

The live handover of a broadcast from one presenter to another. Usually occurs when a newscast presenter finishes their segment or introduction and allows their co-host, reporter, or other colleague to present their own segment that continues the newscast. Also occurs when a presenter on one live or live-to-tape program interacts with that of the program that will immediately air afterwards.
translator
(U.S.) A broadcast facility that repeats another station and rebroadcasts (translates) it onto a different channel. See Broadcast relay station

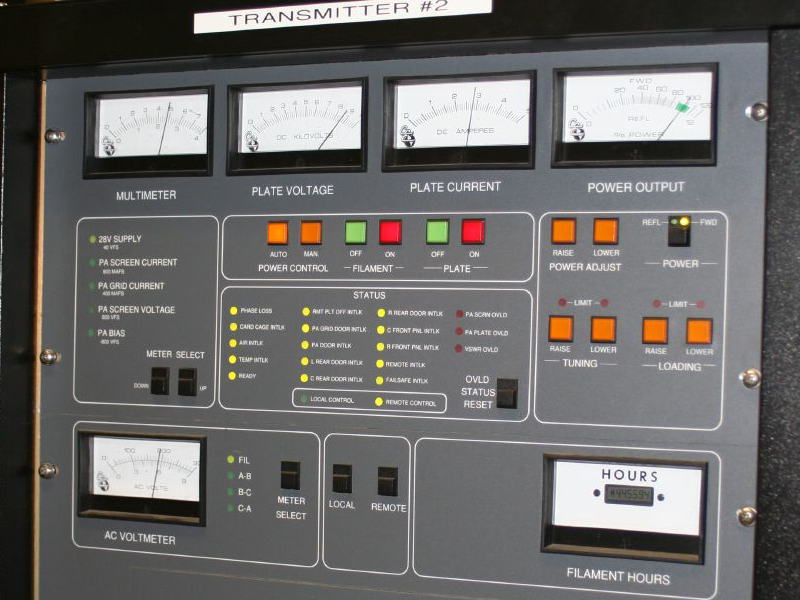
An FM transmitter used by WDET-FM radio.

transmitter
radio transmitter

An electronic device connected to an antenna that generates a radio frequency alternating current. When this current is applied to the antenna, it is excited and radiates radio waves.
transponder
A physical part of a satellite that broadcasts the signal. In colloquial use, the satellite equivalent of the "channel" a television station is broadcast on (e.g. "broadcasting from Transponder 2C of the satellite").
turnstile antenna

== U ==
UHF
Ultra high frequency: Frequencies between 300 MHz (wavelength 1 meter) and 3.0 GHz (wavelength 10 centimeters), used for television broadcasting.
Upconversion
Typically used to increase scan lines on SD video so content can be viewed or processed in a higher resolution environment. Quality is not improved, but scan lines are added to permit a suitable viewing experience in a higher resolution environment.

== V ==
VBI
Vertical blanking interval: The blank area out of sight at the top and bottom of a television picture that allows the raster gun to reset. The space created is often used for Teletext and other services.
VHF
Very high frequency: Frequencies from 30 MHz (wavelength 10 m) to 300 MHz (wavelength 1 m), used for radio and television broadcasting.
VJ
Video jockey: The television version of a disc jockey.
Virtual channel
Logical channel number (LCN)
A number assigned to a television channel broadcast digitally for tuning and identification purposes. This may be a whole number or a two-part number (e.g. 4.1 or 13-3), depending on the standard.
Visual radio
A generic term for adding visuals to normal audio radio broadcasts.
VITC
Vertical Interval Time Code: pronounced vit-see. A non-visible (as opposed to BITC) timecode integrated within the video signal, readable by editing and playback equipment to ensure synchronisation.
VO
Voice over
1. Recorded voice announcer played as off-screen narration in drama or advertising.
2. Video without commentary intended to be aired along with a news correspondent reading the news story.
VOD
Video on demand
On demand videos are basically the opposite of live streaming which gives users the opportunities to view past broadcasts whenever convenient for them from any Internet-connected devices.
VOSOT
Voice over/sound on tape
Video intended to be aired along with a news correspondent reading the news story, which contains at least one soundbite to accompany narration.
VTR
Video tape recorder: A method of recording television pictures by electromagnetic pulses on a sensitized plastic strip.

== W–Z ==
WARC
World Administrative Radio Conference: The regular meetings of the CCIR (now ITU-R) to allocate radio frequency spectrum.
Warehousing
The practice of swapping call signs between two or more radio/TV stations.
Wendy
A large carpeted wedge used to display items for shooting.
Watermark

Wheel

Wheel series

A television series in which two or more regular programs are rotated in the same time slot, sometimes with an umbrella title.
XM Satellite Radio

Defunct American satellite radio platform.
Y
Luminance in many color models used for television broadcast, such as YIQ and YUV.
ZDF
Zweites Deutsches Fernsehen (English: "Second German Television"), a major public television broadcaster in Germany.
zoom
To go from a long shot to a close-up (or vice versa) with the camera.

== See also ==
- Glossary of journalism
- Glossary of motion picture terms
- Glossary of video terms
