= RCTC =

RCTC may refer to:

- Rewritable consumer timecode
- Riverside County Transportation Commission
- RollerCoaster Tycoon Classic
- Rose City Transit Company, a former mass transit provider in Portland, Oregon
- Rochester Community and Technical College, at University Center Rochester
- Royal Calcutta Turf Club
- Regio Corpo Truppe Coloniali
