= Control track =

Track on analogue videotapes used to synchronize tape and scan speeds

A control track is a track that runs along an outside edge of a standard analog videotape (including VHS). The control track encodes a series of pulses, each pulse corresponding to the beginning of each frame. This allows the video tape player to synchronize its scan speed and tape speed to the speed of the recording. Thus, the recorded control track defines the speed of playback (e.g. SP, LP, EP, etc.), and it is also what drives the relative counter clock that most VCRs have.

== Significance and use ==
The control track is used to fine-tune the tape speed during playback, so that the high speed rotating heads remained exactly on their helical tracks rather than somewhere between two adjacent tracks (known as "tracking"). Since good tracking depends on precise distances between the rotating drum and the fixed control/audio head reading the linear tracks, which usually varies by a couple of micrometers between machines due to manufacturing tolerances, most VCRs offer tracking adjustment, either manual or automatic, to correct such mismatches.

The control track is also used to hold index marks, which were normally written at the beginning of each recording session, and can be found using the VCR's index search function: this will fast-wind forward or backward to the nth specified index mark, and resume playback from there. At times, higher-end VCRs provided functions for the user to manually add and remove these marks — so that, for example, they coincide with the actual start of the television program — but this feature later became hard to find.

By the late 1990s, some high-end VCRs offered more sophisticated indexing. For example, Panasonic's Tape Library system assigned an ID number to each cassette, and logged recording information (channel, date, time and optional program title entered by the user) both on the cassette and in the VCR's memory for up to 900 recordings (600 with titles).

== Control track damage ==
A gap in the control track signal of a videotape usually causes a flaw during playback, as the player may lose tracking as soon as the track drops out. This usually leads to a gap in video and audio (since there's no information as to what speed the media is recorded at), the VCR's counter will freeze, and upon re-acquiring the control track, the video sync will be momentarily lost.

Problems with control track signals are almost always caused by a gap in recording, e.g. a recording was resumed beyond (rather than at) the point where recording was previously stopped. A control track error can also be caused by a "dropout" — a defect in the magnetic particles on a tape — but this is uncommon, as the control track is immune to all but the most severe tape damage.

A discontinuous control track was (and still is) especially problematic for analog videotape editing. Each gap in the control track, no matter how brief, destroys synchronization and continuity, which can make a segment of a recorded video difficult or impossible to use for editing.

The acronym LOCT (pronounced locked), used by many video professionals, can mean "Loss Of Control Track" and/or "Loss Of Continuous Timecode." Though either type of "loss" can pose similar problems, and both issues are sometimes directly related, control track and timecode are two different things (see timecode).

Control track problems cannot be "repaired." You can duplicate the tape to restore control track continuity, but this will not fix visual and audible "glitches" caused by gaps in the original control track, and the video itself will suffer quality degradation due to "generation loss."

For this reason, many video professionals would "pre-stripe" every analog videotape to be used in the field or studio beforehand to help ensure good control track throughout. This was done by pre-recording black to the entire videotape. Pre-striping also facilitated spot-checking for dropouts on the video portion of the tape (usually seen as brief white horizontal "dashes") before use.

== Gallery ==
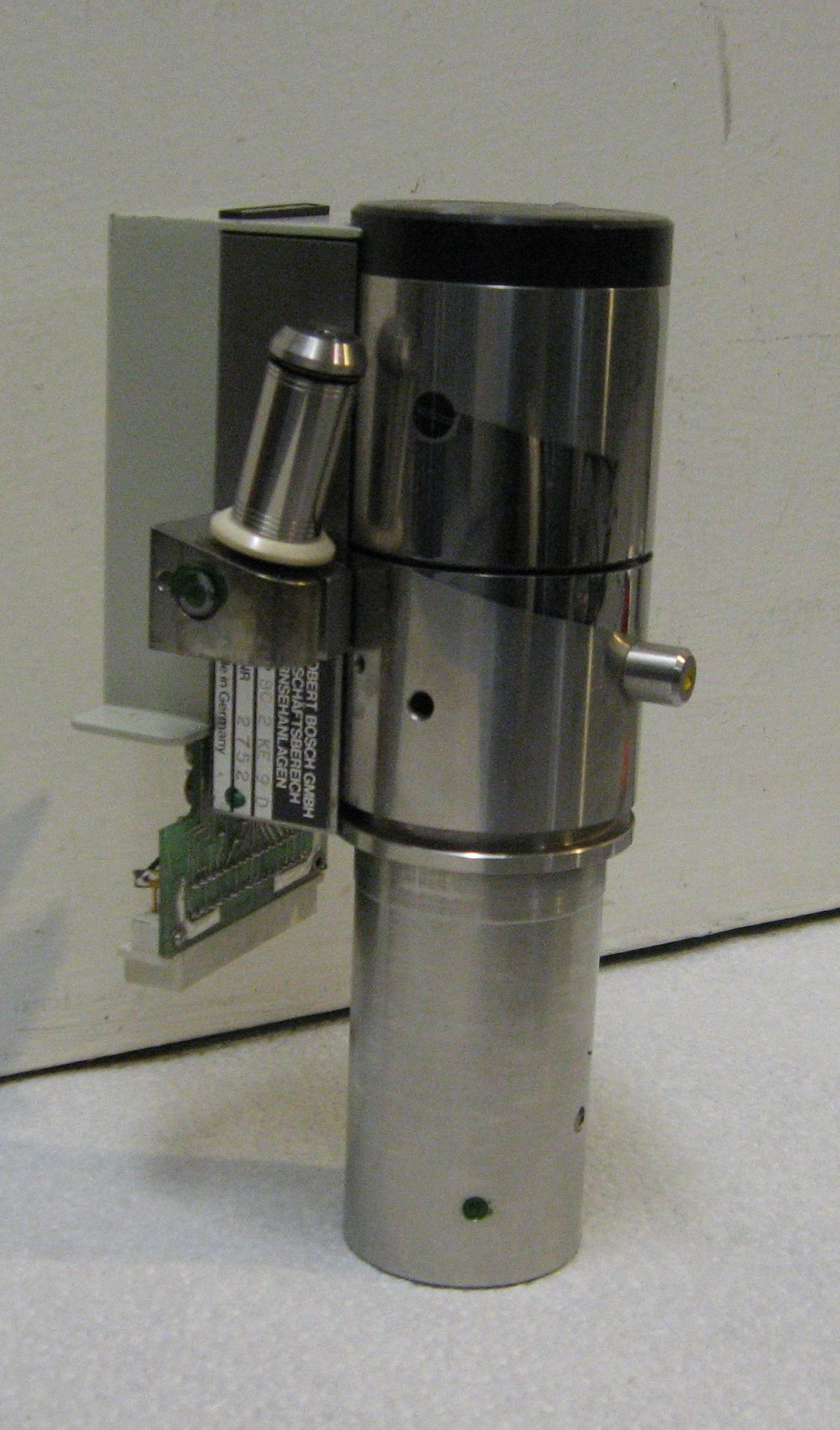
Type B videotape video Scanner Head, note CTR head built into the side of the scanner, the black circle on the side of the scanner.

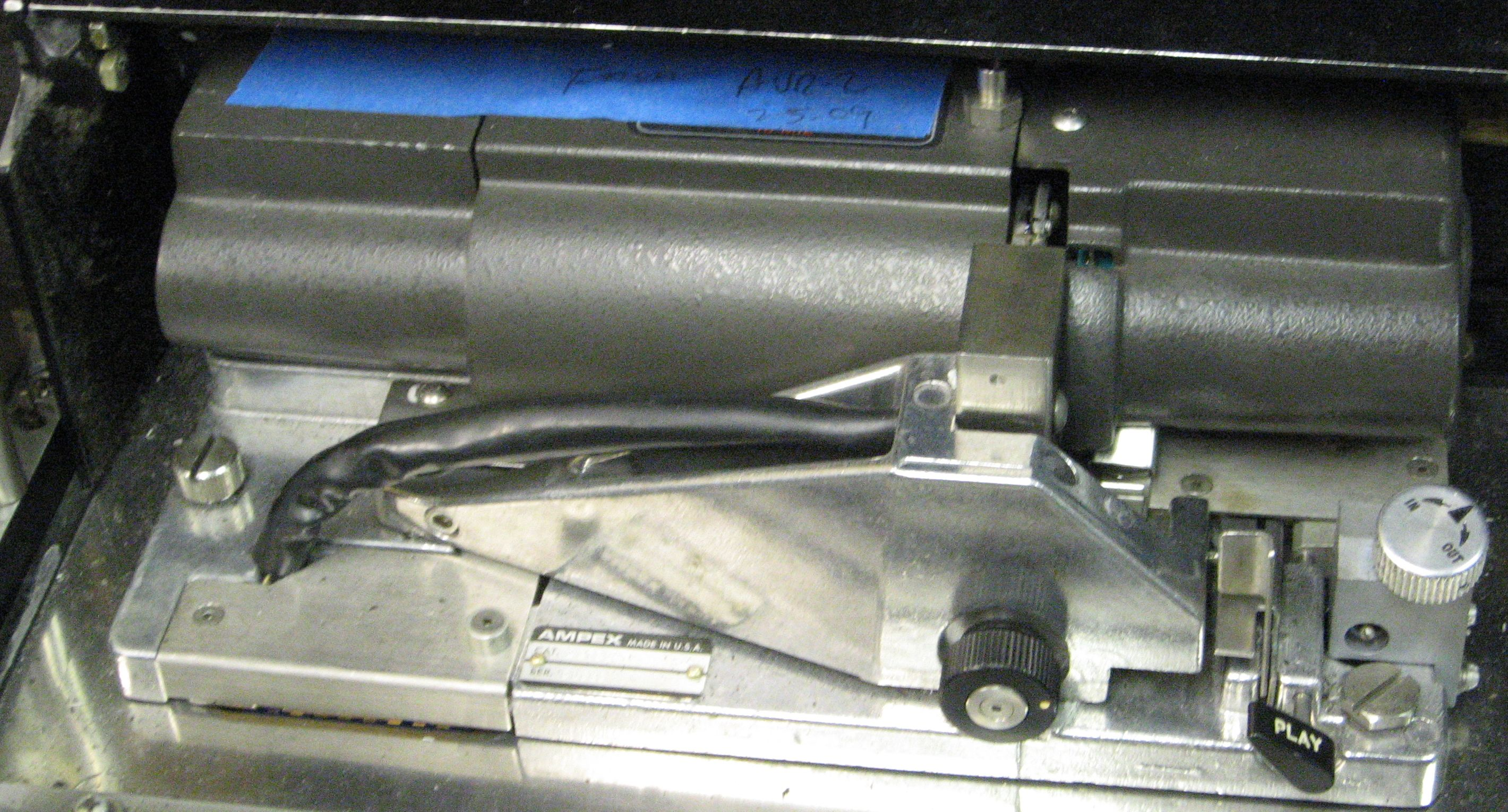
Quadruplex videotape Ampex AVR-2 Video Head, note CTR head, the white square on the lower part of the drum.

== See also ==
- CTL timecode
