= Burnt-in timecode =

Human-readable time display added to a video

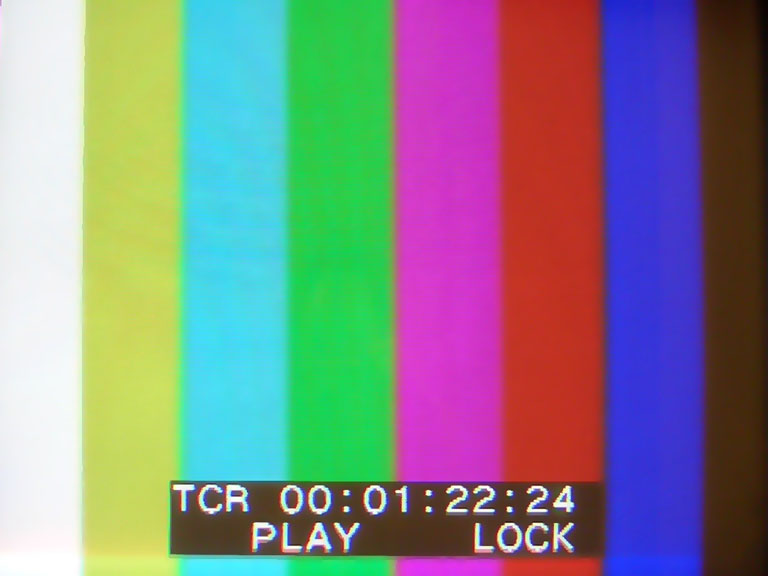
EBU colour bars with burnt-in timecode; likely from a Sony Betacam deck

Burnt-in timecode (often abbreviated to BITC by analogy to VITC) is a human-readable on-screen version of the timecode information for a piece of material superimposed on a video image. BITC is sometimes used in conjunction with "real" machine-readable timecode but more often used in copies of original material onto a nonbroadcast format such as VHS so that the VHS copies can be traced back to their master tape and the original timecodes easily located.

Many professional VTRs can "burn" (overlay) the tape timecode onto one of their outputs. This output (which usually also displays the setup menu or on-screen display) is known as the super out or monitor out. The character switch or menu item turns this behaviour on or off. The character function also displays the timecode on the preview monitors in linear editing suites.

Videotapes that are recorded with timecode numbers overlaid on the video are referred to as window dubs, named after the "window" that displays the burnt-in timecode on-screen.

When editing was done using magnetic tapes that were subject to damage from excessive wear, it was common to use a window dub as a working copy for the majority of the editing process. Editing decisions would be made using a window dub, and no specialized equipment was needed to write down an edit decision list, which would then be replicated from the high-quality masters.

Timecode can also be superimposed on video using a dedicated overlay device, often called a "window dub inserter". This inputs a video signal and its separate timecode audio signal, reads the timecode, superimposes the timecode display over the video, and outputs the combined display (usually via composite), all in real time. Stand-alone timecode generators/readers often have the window dub function built in.

Some consumer cameras, in particular DV cameras, can "burn" (overlay) the tape timecode onto the composite output. This output is typically semitransparent and may include other tape information. It is usually activated by turning on the "display" info in one of the camera's submenus. While not as "professional" as an overlay created by a professional VCR, it is a cheap alternative that is just as accurate.

Timecode is stored in the metadata areas of captured DV AVI files, and some software is able to "burn" (overlay) this into the video frames. For example, DVMP Pro is able to "burn" timecode or other items of DV metadata (such as date and time, iris, shutter speed, gain, white balance mode, etc.) into DV AVI files.

OCR techniques can be used to read BITC in situations where other forms of timecode are not available.

== See also ==
- Linear timecode
- Vertical interval timecode
- SMPTE time code
- MIDI timecode
- CTL timecode
- AES-EBU embedded timecode
- Rewritable consumer timecode
