= Jam sync =

Jam sync refers to the practice of applying a phase hit to a system to bring it in synchronization with another. The term originates from the use of this technique to replace defective time code on a video tape recording by replacing it with a new time code sequence, which may be an extension of a previous good time code sequence on an earlier part of the source material.
