= Vertical interval timecode =

Type of timecode in a video signal

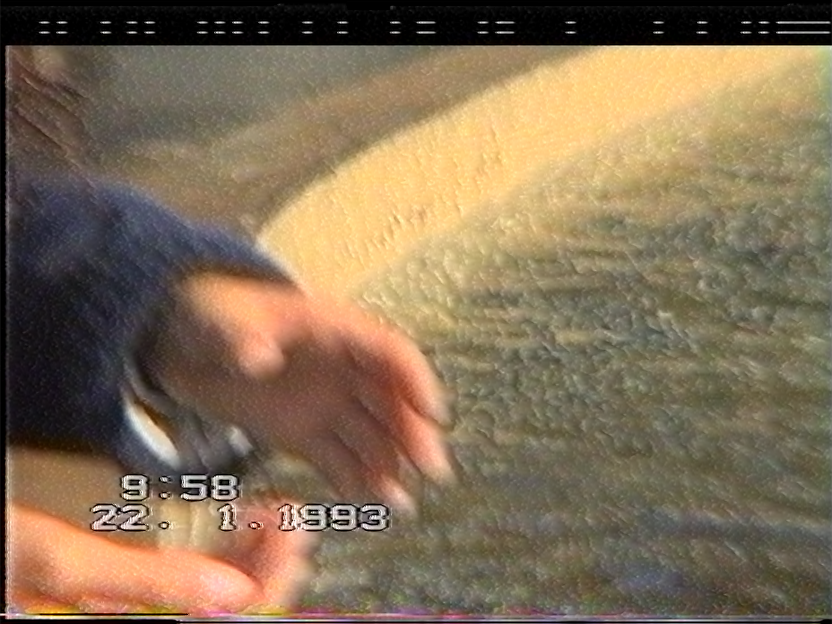
VITC Timecode, presented in the VBI space above the active picture area of a SVHS-C camcorder tape. (928x624 crop of 4fsc 1135x625 25i PAL frame via VHS-Decode)

Vertical Interval Timecode (VITC, pronounced "vitsee") is a form of SMPTE timecode encoded on one scan line in a video signal. These lines are typically inserted into the vertical blanking interval of the video signal.

With one exception, VITC contains the same payload as SMPTE linear timecode (LTC), embedded in a new frame structure with extra synchronization bits and an error-detection checksum. The exception is that VITC is encoded twice per interlaced video frame, once in each field, and one additional bit (the "field flag") is used to distinguish the two fields.

A video frame may contain more than one VITC code if necessary, recorded on different lines. This is often used in production, where different entities may want to encode different sets of time-code metadata on the same tape.

As a practical matter, VITC can be more 'frame-accurate' than LTC, particularly at very slow tape speeds on analog formats. LTC readers can lose track of code at slow jog speeds whereas VITC can be read frame-by-frame if need be. Conversely, at high speeds (FF/rew.), the VITC is often unreadable due to image distortions, so the LTC is often used instead. Some VCRs have an auto selection between the two formats to provide the highest accuracy.

VITC is 90 bits long: 32 bits of time code, 32 bits of user data, 18 synchronization bits, and 8 bits of checksum. It is transmitted using non-return-to-zero encoding at a bit rate of 115 times the line rate. (The unused 25 bit times are to leave room for the horizontal blanking interval.)

SMPTE vertical interval timecode (compliant with SMPTE 12M)
	Sync		Timecode				User bits			
Bit	0	1	2	3	4	5	6	7	8	9
0	1	0	1	2	4	8	User bits			
0	1	0	Frame number (0–23, 24, or 29)				User bits			
10	1	0	Frame number (0–23, 24, or 29)				User bits			
10	1	0	10	20	D	C	User bits			
20	1	0	1	2	4	8	User bits			
20	1	0	Seconds (0–59)				User bits			
30	1	0	Seconds (0–59)				User bits			
30	1	0	10	20	40	F	User bits			
40	1	0	1	2	4	8	User bits			
40	1	0	Minutes (0–59)				User bits			
50	1	0	Minutes (0–59)				User bits			
50	1	0	10	20	40	F	User bits			
60	1	0	1	2	4	8	User bits			
60	1	0	Hours (0–23)				User bits			
70	1	0	Hours (0–23)				User bits			
70	1	0	10	20	S	F	User bits			
80	1	0	CRC bits (g(x) = x^{8} + 1)							

- Bit 14 is set to 1 if drop frame numbering is in use; frame numbers 0 and 1 are skipped during the first second of every minute, except multiples of 10 minutes. This converts 30 frame/second time code to the 29.97 frame/second NTSC standard.
- Bit 15, the color framing bit, is set to 1 if the time code is synchronized to a (color) video signal. The frame number modulo 2 (for NTSC and SECAM) or modulo 4 (for PAL) should be preserved across cuts in order to avoid phase jumps in the chrominance subcarrier.
- Bits 35, 55, and 75 differ between 25 frame/s time code, and 30/29.97 frame/s. The bits are:
  - Field flag (bit 35 for 29.97/30 frame/s, bit 75 for 25 frame/s): This is an additional least-significant bit for the frame number, distinguishing the two interlaced fields in one video frame. It is set to 0 during the first field of a frame, and to 1 during the second. This bit replaces the "polarity correction" bit in linear timecode.
  - "Binary group flag" bits BGF0 and BGF2 (bits 55 and 75 for 29.97/30 frame/s, bits 35 and 55 for 25 frame/s): These indicate the format of the user bits. Both bits zero indicates no (or unspecified) format. Only BGF0 set indicates four 8-bit characters (transmitted little-endian). The combinations with BGF2 set are reserved.
- Bit 74 ("Binary group flag 1") was previously unassigned, but is used to indicate that the time code is synchronized to an external clock. If zero, the timecode start time is arbitrary.
- The checksum in bits 82–89 is a simple bytewise XOR of the previous 82 bits (including the sync bits, so bit 82 is the XOR of bits 74, 66, ..., 2), which can be described as a CRC with generator polynomial x^{8}+1. (Preset to zero, no inversion.)

The exact nature of the color frame sequence depends on the video standard being used. In the case of the three main composite video standards, PAL video has an 8-field (4 frame) color frame sequence, and NTSC and SECAM both have 4-field (2 frame) color frame sequences.

Preserving the color framing sequence of video across edits and between channels in video effects was an important issue in early analog composite videotape editing systems, as cuts between different color sequences would cause jumps in subcarrier phase, and mixing two signals of different field dominance would result in color artifacts on the part of the signal that was not in sync with the output color frame sequence.

To help prevent these problems, SMPTE time code contains a color framing bit, which can be used to indicate that the video material the timecode refers to follows a standard convention regarding the synchronization of video time code and the color framing sequence. If the color framing bit was set in both types of material, the editing system could then always ensure that color framing was preserved by constraining edit decisions between input sources to keep the correct relationship between the timecode sequences, and hence the color framing sequences.

== See also ==
Related technologies and standards

- Linear timecode
- Burnt-in timecode
- CTL timecode
- MIDI timecode
- AES-EBU embedded timecode
- Rewritable consumer timecode
