= Field dominance =

Interlaced video signal variations

In video engineering, field dominance refers to the choice of which field of an interlaced video signal is chosen as the point at which video edits or switches occur.

There are two main choices for field dominance: odd or even. With odd field dominance the edit or switch occurs at the start of the odd field. With even field dominance the edit or switch occurs at the start of the even field (some equipment, such as vision mixers or switchers allow the field dominance to be set to 'none' which means the switch will occur on the next field boundary after the switch has been pressed).

Interlacing divides the frame into two fields, each containing half the number of lines. Each field is scanned in 1/60 second under the 525-line system (or 480i – often incorrectly referred to as NTSC) or 1/50 of a second under the 625-line system (or 576i – often incorrectly referred to as PAL). With interlaced systems there are an odd number of lines in each frame. This means that there is a half-line offset between the fields, therefore the lines in the second field will be positionally interleaved with the lines in the first field.

The lines are numbered in the order in which they are scanned (so it is incorrect to talk of the 'odd numbered lines' and the 'even numbered lines' when referring to interlaced video - but see PsF line numbers below). In 525/60 systems, by convention, the first field in the frame is considered the even field. In 625/50 systems, by convention, the first field in the frame is considered the odd field.

Selecting a consistent field dominance in vision switching and linear editing systems will also help maintain color framing synchronization. Re-editing old video material already edited with a different field dominance convention can be problematic, as it can lead to "flash fields" when old and new edits are made too close together.

The term field dominance is often incorrectly used to refer to field order, particularly when referring to a field order error such as can occur when converting between certain different video file formats. Analogue 525/60 systems field one, line one starts when the falling edge of the first equalizing pulse is coincident with the start of a line. In 625/50 systems field one line one starts with line sync being coincident with the falling edge of the first broad pulse in the analogue field sync. Digital formats use a single-bit in their Timing Reference Sequence as the "Field" flag. Field flag bit F=0 marks the first field of each frame. F=1 Marks the second field.

== PsF line numbers ==
In progressive segmented frame (PsF), which is a way of sending a progressively scanned picture over an interlaced system, each alternate field will contain the odd and even lines of the original progressive scan. But once it is being carried as an interlaced picture the lines are numbered in the order they are being sent as with any 'normal' interlaced system.

== Obsolescence ==
As of 2026, the dominance of digital compressed progressive scan video has rendered considerations of field dominance obsolete for modern video material. However, a substantial amount of archive material still exists in interlaced formats, and the maintenance of field dominance remains important for that material.

== See also ==
- Color framing
