= Timing synchronization function =

Timing synchronization function (TSF) is specified in IEEE 802.11 wireless local area network (WLAN) standard to fulfill timing synchronization among users. A TSF keeps the timers for all stations in the same basic service set (BSS) synchronized. All stations shall maintain a local TSF timer. Each mobile host maintains a TSF timer with modulus $2^{64}$ counting in increments of microseconds. The TSF is based on a 1-MHz clock and "ticks" in microseconds. On a commercial level, industry vendors assume the 802.11 TSF's synchronization to be within 25 microseconds.

Timing synchronization is achieved by stations periodically exchanging timing information through beacon frames. In (intra) BSS, the AP sends the TSF information in the beacons. In Independent Basic Service Set (IBSS, ad-hoc), each station competes to send the beacon.

Each station maintains a TSF timer counting in increments of microseconds (μs). Stations adopt a received timing if it is later than the station's own TSF timer.

== IBSS operation overview ==
All stations in the IBSS adopt a common value, aBeaconPeriod, that defines the length of beacon intervals or periods. This value, established by the station that initiates the IBSS, defines a series of Target Beacon Transmission Times (TBTTs) exactly aBeaconPeriod time units apart. Time zero is defined to be a TBTT.

All stations in the IBSS compete for beacon transmission every aBeaconPeriod time units. This time period is called a beacon period (BP). At the beginning of each BP, there is a beacon generation window consisting of $w+1$ slots each of length aSlotTime. Each station calculates a random delay uniformly distributed in $[ 0, w]$ and is scheduled to transmit a beacon when the delay timer expires. If a beacon arrives before the random delay timer has expired, the station cancels the pending beacon transmission and the remaining random delay. Upon receiving a beacon, a station sets its TSF timer to the timestamp of the beacon if the value of the timestamp is later than the station's TSF timer.

== See also ==
- Point coordination function
