= Keykode =

Barcode-based film markings developed by Eastman Kodak

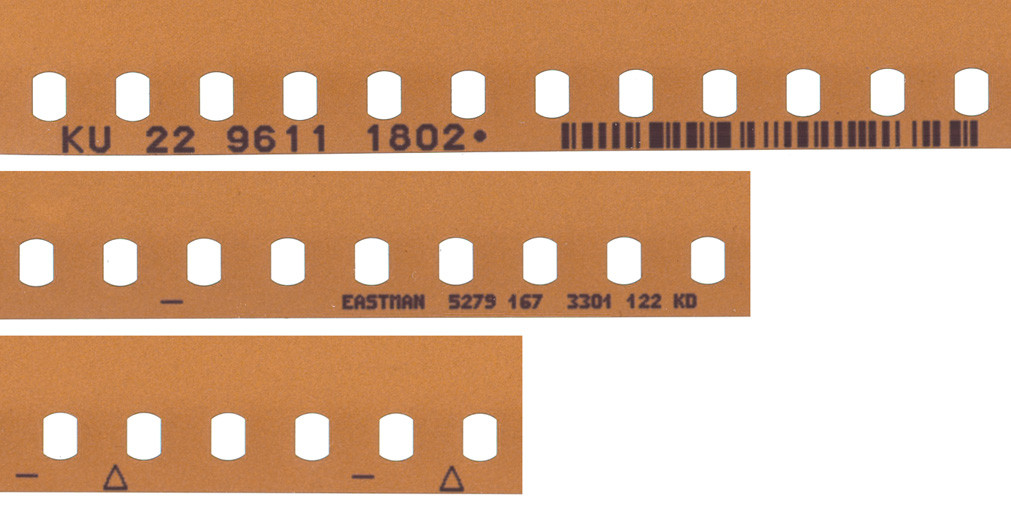
A scanned image of Keykode from a piece of unexposed, developed 35 mm Eastman Kodak motion picture color negative from 1997. All of these slices are from the same side of the same piece of negative, cropped and stacked for simplicity.: Top: Human-readable Keykode number (the number to the far right advances by one for each 16 frames of 35 mm film or 20 frames of 16 mm film). Next to that is the same information in USS-128 Barcode machine-readable language.; Middle: Further down the film (within the 16 frames) is the film identifier information and date symbol.; Bottom: Other-use symbols.

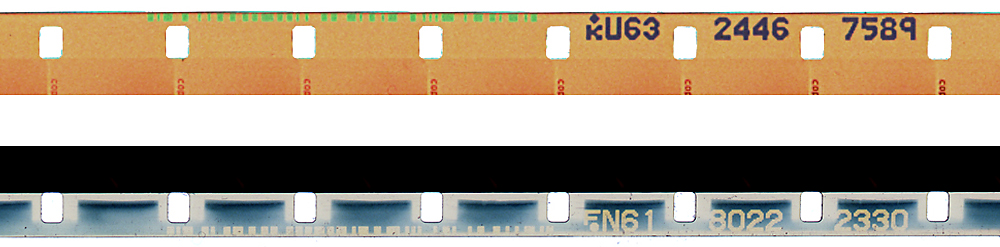
These images show 16mm Eastman Kodak keykode (top) and Fujifilm MR-code (bottom) The Fuji example was scanned from a positive print, but it shows the codes from the negative. Neither scan shows the manufacturer's information, which is repeated every 80 frames on 16mm film. Note that the "Zero Frame" dot is placed above the first character due to the smaller size of 16mm. Both the barcode and the human-readable characters refer to the frame marked by this dot.

Keykode (also written as either KeyKode or KeyCode) is an Eastman Kodak Company advancement on edge numbers, which are letters, numbers and symbols placed at regular intervals along the edge of 35 mm and 16 mm film to allow for frame-by-frame specific identification. It was introduced in 1990.

Keykode is a variation of timecode used in the post-production process which is designed to uniquely identify film frames in a film stock.

== Edge numbers ==
Edge numbers (also called key numbers or footage numbers) are a series of numbers with key lettering printed along the edge of a 35 mm negative at intervals of one foot (16 frames or 64 perforations) and on a 16 mm negative at intervals of six inches (twenty frames). The numbers are placed on the negative at the time of manufacturing by one of two methods:

Latent image exposes the edge of the film while it passes through the perforation machine. This method is primarily used for color negative films.

Visible ink is sometimes used to imprint on the edge of the film – again in manufacturing – at the time of perforations. The ink, which is not affected by photographic chemicals, is normally printed onto the base surface of the film. The numbers are visible on both the raw stock (unexposed) and processed (exposed and developed) film. This method is primarily used for black & white negative film.

The edge numbers serve a number of purposes. Every key frame is numbered with a multi-digit identifier that may be referred to later. In addition, a date of manufacturing is imprinted, then the type of emulsion and the batch number. This information is transferred from the negative (visible once developed) to the positive prints. The print may be edited and handled while the original negative remains safely untouched. When the film editing is complete, the edge numbers on the final cut film correspond back to their identical frames on the original negative so that a conform edit can be made of the original negative to match the work print.

Laboratories can also imprint their own edge numbers on the processed film negative or print to identify the film for their own means. This is normally done in yellow ink. A common workflow for film editing involves edge-coding printed film simultaneously with the film's synchronized audio track, on 35mm magnetic film, so that a foot of film and its synchronized audio have identical edge numbers.

Eastman Kodak began using latent image edge numbering on their manufactured 35mm raw film stocks in 1919.

== Keykode ==
With the popularity of telecine transfers and video edits, Kodak invented a machine readable edge number that could be recorded via computer, read by the editing computer and automatically produce a "cut list" from the video edit of the film.

To do this, Kodak utilized the USS-128 barcode alongside the human-readable edge numbers. They also improved the quality and readability of the human-readable information to make it easier to identify. The Keykode consists of 12 characters in human-readable form followed by the same information in barcode form. Keykode is a form of metadata identifier for film negatives.

=== Keykode deciphered ===
An example Keykode:

KU 22 9611 1802+02.3

- The first two letters in the Keykode are the manufacturer code (E and K both stand for Kodak, F stands for Fuji, etc.) and the stock identifier, respectively (in this case Kodak's U standing for 5279 emulsion); each manufacturer has different stocks' naming convention for their emulsion codes.
- The next six numbers in the Keykode (usually split in 2+4 digits) are the identification number for that roll of film. On Kodak film stocks, it remains consistent for the entire roll. Fuji Stocks will increment this number when the frame number advances past "9999".
- Computers read the (optional) frame offset (marked every four perforations on actual film by a single "-" dash) by adding digits to the Keykode after the plus sign. In this case, a frame offset of two frames (with respect to the film foot) is specified. The number of frames within a film foot depends on both the film width and the frame pulldown itself, and can also be uneven within the same roll, but rather repeat periodically (like in the 35mm 3perf. pulldown).
- The last (optional), dot-separated number is the perforation offset which, if preceded by a frame offset like in the above example, is a bias within the just-specified frame; otherwise (as interpreted by most DI software) this considered to be an offset within the whole film foot.

EASTMAN 5279 167 3301 122 KD

- These numbers are consistent for a whole batch of film and may not change in many rolls. EASTMAN is the film manufacturer, 5279 is the stock type identifier. The next three numbers (167) is the emulsion batch number. The next series of four digits (3301) is the roll and part code, followed by the printer identification number that made the Keykode (122) and finally a two letter date designation (KD). In this case, KD=1997.

== See also ==
- 35 mm film
- Color motion picture film
- Film stock
- List of motion picture film stocks
- Film base
- Timecode
