= Field (video) =

Still image forming part of a video

In video, a field is one of the many still images displayed sequentially to create the impression of motion on the screen. Normally, two fields comprise one video frame in what is known as 2:1 interlacing. 3:1, 4:1 and 5:1 interlacing also exist. When the fields are displayed on a video monitor, they are "interlaced" such that one field is displayed on the odd-numbered lines of the screen, and the other field is displayed on the even-numbered lines. Converting fields to a still frame image requires a process called deinterlacing, in which the missing lines are duplicated or interpolated to recreate the information that would have been contained in the discarded field. Since each field contains only half of the information of a full frame, however, deinterlaced images do not have the resolution of a full frame. Sometimes in interlaced video, a field is called a frame, which can lead to confusion.

To increase the resolution of video images, new schemes have been created that capture full-frame images for each frame. Video composed of such frames is called progressive scan video.

Video shot with a standard video camera format such as S-VHS or Mini-DV is often interlaced when created. In contrast, video shot with a film-based camera is usually progressive. Free-to-air analog TV was widely broadcast as interlaced material because the trade-off of spatial resolution for frame rate reduced flickering on cathode-ray tube (CRT) televisions. Today, digital high-definition television can be broadcast terrestrially or distributed through cable systems in either interlaced (1080i) or progressive scan formats (720p or 1080p). Most prosumer camcorders can record in progressive scan formats.

In video editing, the term "dominant field" refers to the process of interlaced video, which is common in older video formats. Interlaced video splits each frame into two fields: the odd fields and the even fields. Selecting edit points on the wrong field can result in a "flash" at each edit point, and playing the video fields in reverse order creates a flickering image.

== See also ==
- Color framing, color field sequence
- Low-definition television § Video games, special use of fields in video games
