= Control track longitudinal timecode =

Control track longitudinal timecode, or CTL timecode, developed by JVC in the early 1990s, is a unique technique for embedding, or striping, reference SMPTE timecode onto a videotape.

Similar to the way VITC timecode is embedded in the vertical interval area of a video signal, CTL timecode embeds SMPTE timecode in the control track area of helical scan video recordings. The advantage of both VITC and CTL timecode is that an audio track does not have to be sacrificed for linear timecode.

Though a very effective technology, and still probably in limited use today, CTL timecode never really caught on. JVC is apparently the only manufacturer that included CTL timecode capability in their video products, and this was limited to select professional S-VHS equipment.

When it was introduced, there was much negativity about CTL timecode, because people misunderstood how it worked. Many incorrectly assumed that CTL timecode was nothing more than a control track pulse signal.

Control Track Pulse: Most are familiar with the digital "counters" on VHS recorders and camcorders, viewed via the onscreen display (OSD) and/or a dedicated LED display. These numbers are sometimes in real-time format (hours:minutes:seconds), but are often only an ambiguous 4 digit sequential counter. These numbers advance up or down based on the machine counting a tape's control track pulses. This type of display is useful only as a simple and temporary reference, as it is very inaccurate, and the counter is reset to zero when a tape is inserted. A basic 4 digit counter is almost completely worthless, as their rate of advance was never standardized by manufacturers.

Conversely, CTL timecode is an absolute timecode with specific digital references for every frame of video. Thus, a tape with CTL timecode can always display current timecode position accurately, even if the tape is moved from one machine to another. CTL timecode embedding can be transferred when making a copy, as long as the recording machine supports CTL timecode. Because CTL timecode is SMPTE timecode, its timecode can be interchanged with other SMPTE timecode schemes, like VITC and LTC (linear, audio track) timecode, as well as SMPTE timecode devices like timecode readers, generators, window dub inserters, MIDI synchronizers, and edit controllers.

CTL timecode is vulnerable to any gaps or problems in a tape's control track, but so is LTC and VITC timecode. The acronym LOCT (pronounced locked), used by many video professionals, can mean "Loss of Control Track", and/or "Loss of Continuous Timecode".

== See also ==
- AES-EBU embedded timecode
- Burnt-in timecode
- MIDI timecode
- Rewritable consumer timecode
