= Color frame sequence =

Frame sequence for color composite video signals

In video engineering, the color frame sequence is the sequence of fields in an analog composite video signal through which the video frame timing and chrominance subcarrier signal timing—in particular, that of the color burst—cycle through all possible phase relationships. The process of maintaining this alignment through the process of analog composite video recording, editing and broadcast was known as color framing.

The exact nature of the color frame sequence depends on the video standard being used. In the case of the two main composite video standards, both of which use analog quadrature amplitude modulation for the chrominance signal, PAL has an 8-field (4 frame) color frame sequence, and NTSC has a 4-field (2 frame) color frame sequence. Because it uses frequency modulation for the chrominance subcarrier, SECAM does not have the subcarrier phase sensitivity problems of NTSC or PAL, but a field phase sequence was usually imposed to reduce visible artifacts on monochrome receivers.

== Use in analog videotape editing ==
Preserving the color framing sequence of video across edits and between channels in video effects was an important issue in early analog composite videotape editing systems, as cuts between different color sequences would cause jumps in subcarrier phase, and mixing two signals with different frame sequence alignments would result in color artifacts on the part of the signal that was not in sync with the output color frame sequence, rotating that signal's colours within the chroma color space.

To help prevent these problems, Bit 11 of the SMPTE timecode frame is the Color Frame Flag, which can be used to indicate that the timecode is aligned to the color framing sequence so that composite video editing equipment could make sure to edit only on appropriate color frame sequence boundaries in order to prevent picture corruption. Specific definitions of this timing relationship were defined for both NTSC and PAL colour standards. If the color framing bit was set in both types of material, the editing system could then always ensure that color framing was preserved by constraining edit decisions between input sources to keep the correct relationship between the timecode sequences, and hence the color framing sequences.

== Obsolescence ==
Color framing has become largely an issue of historical interest, first with the advent in the 1980s of digital composite video timebase correctors and frame stores, which could regenerate the color frame sequence of a composite signal at any phase, and later with analog component video editing and modern digital video systems, in which subcarrier phase is no longer relevant. Color frame sequence considerations are thus only relevant to remaining archived composite video recordings, and even those are typically dealt with automatically in the process of digitization.

== See also ==
- Field dominance
- Dot crawl
- Colour recovery
