= Rewritable consumer timecode =

The Rewriteable Consumer Timecode (RCTC, RC Timecode, or RC Time Code) is a nearly frame accurate timecode method developed by Sony for 8mm and Hi8 analog tape formats. The RC timecode tags each frame with the hour, minute, second and frame for each frame of video recorded to tape. Officially, RCTC is accurate to within ±2 to 5 frames. The RC timecode can be used in conjunction with the datacode to record the date and the time. The data and RC codes are written between the video and the PCM audio tracks. It may be added to any 8-mm tape without altering the information already on the tape, and is invisible to machines not equipped to read it.

On several video camera models, Sony included the ability to search by date/time (appropriately called Date Search) and to index positions within the tape so that the index mark could be returned to with the press of a button.

The RC timecode is a different technology than the SMPTE timecode, linear timecode (LTC), and vertical interval timecode (VITC).

At least one manufacturer (Octochron) created tools to capture the information from the RC timecode on tape and export it via Serial or USB to the computer.

A partial list of camcorders which supported RC timecode.

NTSC Camcorder Models with RC Timecode
Sony CCD-SC55
Sony CCD-TR101
Sony CCD-TR2300
Sony CCD-TR3000
Sony CCD-TR3300
Sony CCD-TR3400
Sony CCD-TR555
Sony CCD-TR700
Sony CCD-TR910
Sony CCD-TRV101
Sony CCD-TRV81
Sony CCD-TRV99
Sony CCD-V801, the first camcorder with RC timecode
Sony CCD-VX3

PAL Camcorder Models with RC Timecode
Sony CCD-SC55E
Sony CCD-TR2200E
Sony CCD-TR2300E
Sony CCD-TR3100E
Sony CCD-TR3200E
Sony CCD-TR3300E
Sony CCD-TR3400E
Sony CCD-TR555E
Sony CCD-TR825E
Sony CCD-TR845E
Sony CCD-TRV69E
Sony CCD-TRV77E

== See also ==
- Linear timecode (LTC)
- Vertical interval timecode (VITC)
- CTL timecode
- MIDI timecode
- AES-EBU embedded timecode
