= Color subcarrier =

Video signal component

A color subcarrier, sometimes called a chrominance subcarrier, is a separate subcarrier signal that carries the color information during transmission of a composite video signal. It is synchronized using the color burst signal. By synchronizing the subcarrier with the local oscillator of the television receiver, the composite video chrominance signal can be decoded successfully.
