= Autoconform =

Video editing post-production process

Autoconform is the video editing and post-production process where an online editing system combines a timecode based edit decision list (EDL) created from an offline editing system with the original video and audio source material to produce a version of the edited video which is a high quality (usually broadcast quality) analogue of the programme produced in the offline editing system.

This process can be compared with word processing, where the edits required to make a document are made on a PC, and draft copies are printed out on a low-quality printer. When the creative process has been completed, the final version can be sent to a professional printer, who can reproduce the document at full quality.
