= CMX Systems =

CMX Editing Systems (also known as CMX Systems) was a company founded jointly by CBS and Memorex; with help from many individuals such as Ronald Lee Martin, who later became a head of Universal Studios; that developed some of the first computerized systems for linear and non-linear editing of videotape for post production. The company's name, CMX, stood for CBS, Memorex, and eXperimental.

== History ==
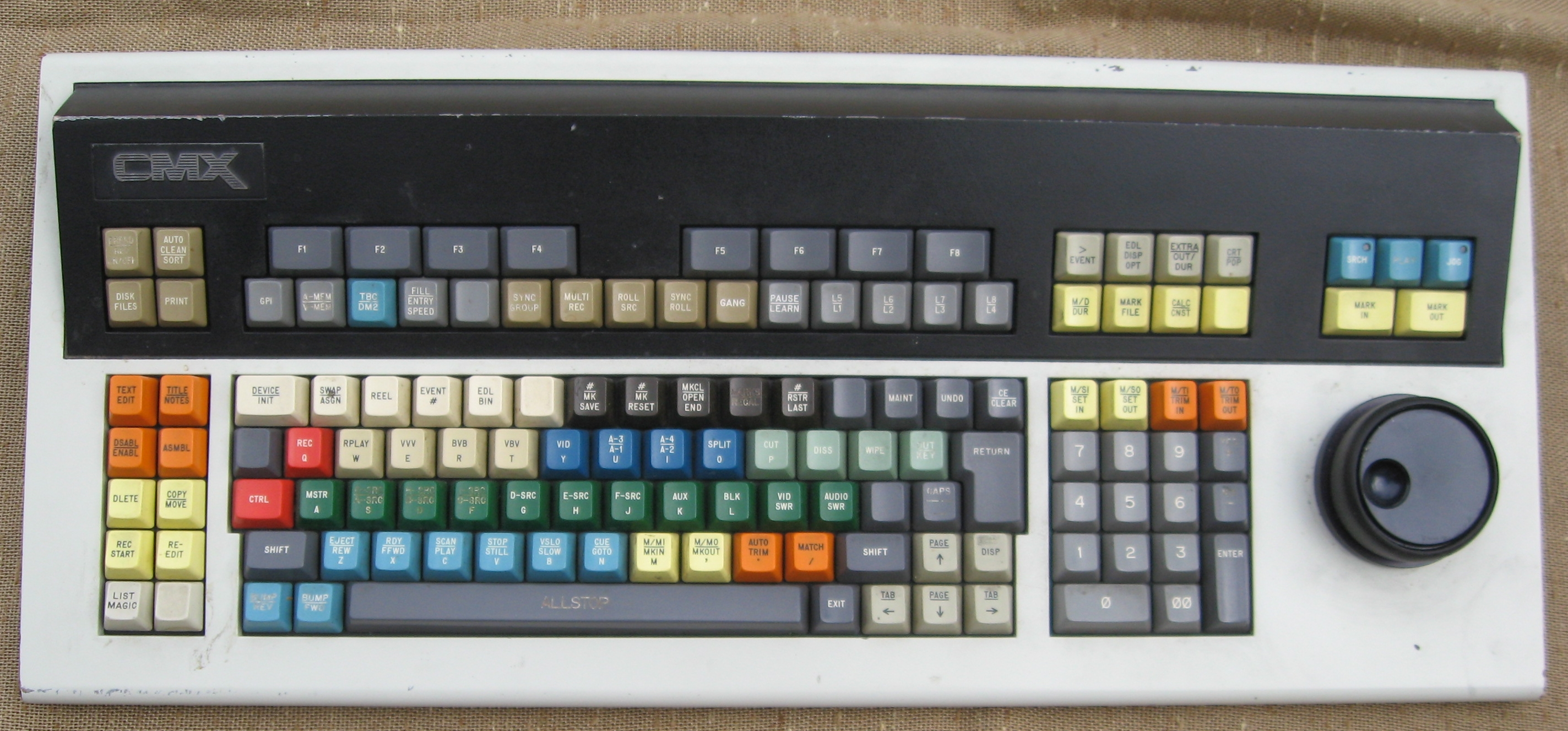
CMX keyboard

Headquartered in Sunnyvale, California, the company pioneered integrating computers with videotape editing, starting in 1971 with the CMX 600, the first linear video editing system. The 600 was designed primarily for off-line editing, by creating both a rough cut edit of a video program, along with an edit decision list, or EDL. It stored its video & audio content on disk pack drives supplied by Memorex for instant random access to the video content. The 600 was paired with the CMX-200, which took the edit decision list created by the 600, and automatically controlled several VTRs to auto-assemble the final program. The 600 was controlled using a Digital PDP-11 minicomputer, and the 200 used a Teletype Model 33 terminal to input EDLs from the 600.

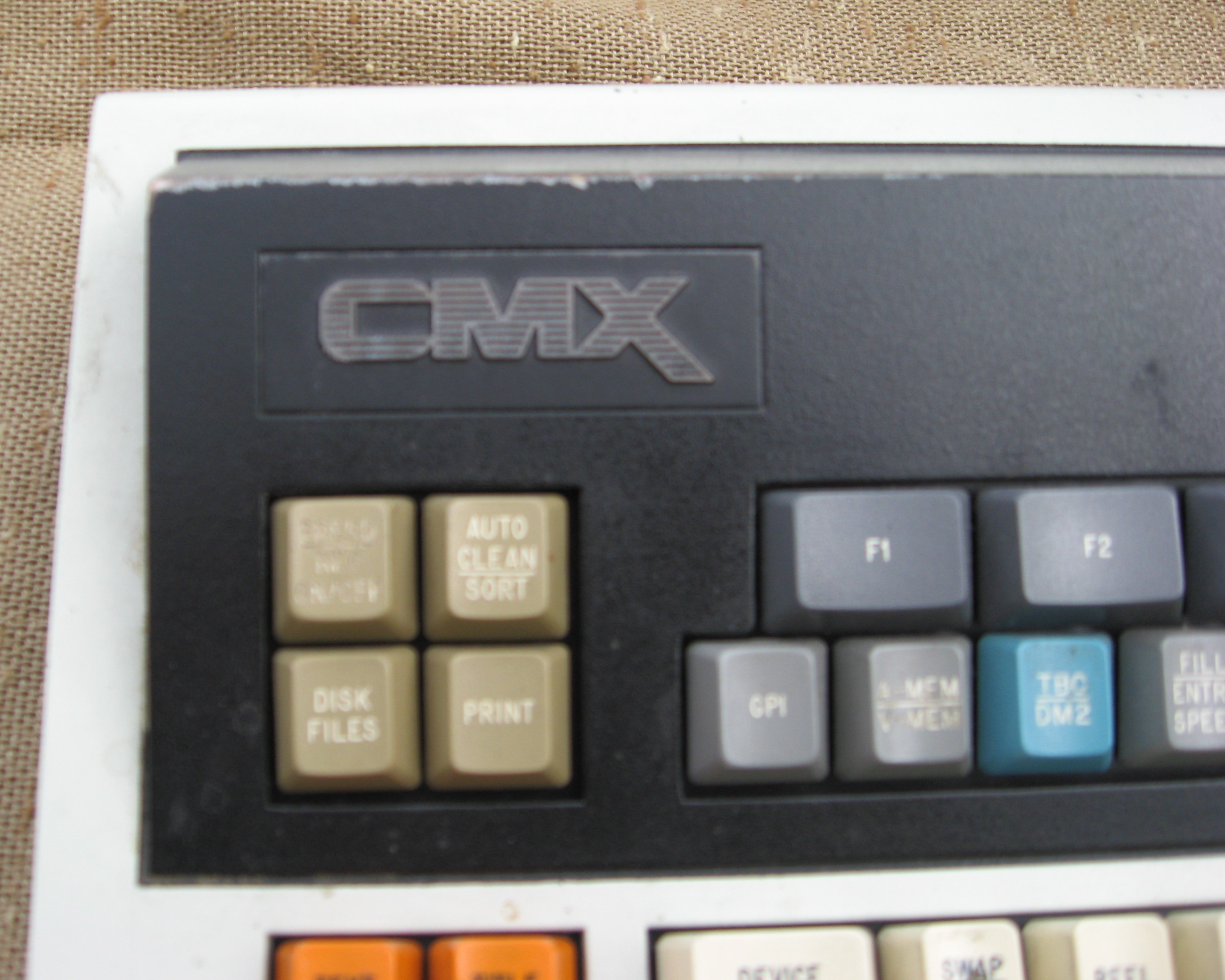
CMX keyboard close-up

CMX also developed the CMX-300 in 1972, a system used for online editing (and CMX's first online product). It was a computer-controlled linear editing system, with support for up to four VTRs, and also included and controlled a simple video mixer for wipes and fades. The edits were input to the 300 (and displayed) using a Digital VT-05 terminal.

CMX would later develop more advanced systems such as the 340 in 1976, and the CMX Edge, which could be used for both on and off-line editing.

CMX was sold to John Herbert Orr's company Orrox in 1974, and then moved its headquarters to Santa Clara, California. It was then later purchased by Chyron, and remained under its ownership until 1998, when Chyron announced that it would discontinue all CMX products.

During the mid-1980s, CMX hardware comprised 90% of all video editing systems used for post-production video editing.

The CMX keyboard control style was used as a basis of several other editing systems, including Grass Valley, Calaway and Strassner Editing Systems.

== Models ==
- CMX-200 – A Teletype driven auto-assembly system released in 1971. It was used to load the edit lists produced by the CMX-600 to control source and record Quad VTRs and built the program.
- CMX-300 – Introduced at NAB 1972, it was CMX's first EDL-based online editor. It could control up to four VTR's (generally 2" Quadruplex VTR's) with a simple audio mixer and video switcher.
- CMX-400 – Designed for offline videotape editing using IVC 870 1" helical scan VTR's.
- CMX-600 – First announced in 1971, it was the first non-linear video editing system. It consisted of a DEC PDP-11 computer, several Memorex disk pack drives modified to record 5 minutes of analog "skip-field" black & white video (with digital PCM audio embedded in the vertical blanking of the video, much like Sound-in-Syncs) per each of its 29 MB disc platters, and a console for the editor/operator. The 600 also used time code that would later become standardized as SMPTE timecode. The CMX 600 output was punch tape designed to be used by the CMX 200 linear online assembly system.
- CMX 50 – An edit controller considered the first viable 3/4" VCR offline editing system.
- CMX-330A –
- CMX-3100B –
- CMX-340 – Launched in 1976, the CMX-340 introduced its Intelligent Interfaces (I2) that allowed the interfacing of a variety of VTR and video switchers. The 340 had a jog knob box called a GIZMO which was integrated into the keyboard. It featured transport buttons and could be re-positioned for left-handed editors. Eighteen months after its introduction, over 90% of all videotape editing for broadcast was done on a CMX system.
- CMX-340X –
- CMX EDGE – Used as both an offline and online editing system, it featured a novel interface that included a built-in CRT and two integrated jog knobs.
- CMX-3400 – Developed in 1979. A highly popular online videotape editor.
- CMX-3400 Plus – The planned 3400 Plus never made it past prototype. It was to have voice activation control, a new mappable keyboard with LEDs on each key to describe the available functions, a windowed GUI and advanced database management features among others.
- CMX-3600 – Highly popular online videotape editor.
- CMX-6000 – Introduced in 1986, the CMX-6000 was a videodisc-based offline video editing system for long forms editing, particularly tel-series and theatrical feature film (with Kodak KeyCode).
- CMX CINEMA – In 1993, CMX came with a new digital video version of its 6000 videodisc offline editor with a Window and mouse-driven interface.
- CMX CASS 1 – A timecode-based audio editing and console automation system. The CASS 1 was released in 1986.
- OMNI-1000E – An entirely redesign hardware platform that could control up to 10 devices concurrently including analog and digital VTRs and ATRs, video switchers (with their effects timeline separately), and video post production audio mixers. It had a color GUI and was develop on an early version of X-Windows. The OMNI series editors had the jog dial now integrated into the keyboard.
- OMNI-500 – A scaled-down version of the OMNI-1000E. It used the same platform but was limited to control a maximum of 5 devices concurrently. The OMNI-500 had less EDL management functionalities.
- OMNI-1000 AEGIS – It featured an enhanced keyboard that included assignable dials with mini-display along with an integrated 3.5" floppy disk unit above the jog knob. The knobs were used to modify, save and recall Time Base Corrector (TBC) settings on an event per event basis.

== See also ==
- Strassner Editing Systems, one example of other "CMX Style", PC-based editing systems. Another popular system was the Calloway. developed by Jack Calloway, and the ETC. All these were examples of CMX style systems.
- 2" Quadruplex (Ampex, RCA and Bosch's Fernseh)
- 1" Type A (Ampex)
- 1" Type B (Bosch's Fernseh – BTS Philips)
- IVC 2 inch Helical scan (International Video Corporation's IVC 9000 Format)
- 1" Type C (Sony, Ampex, NEC and Hitachi)
- Timeline, the history of editing (John Buck 2018). (incl complete CMX-600 storyline)(Tablo Books ISBN 9781922192295).
- (Free public access to Timeline, the history of editing Analog 1)
