= CMX =

CMX may refer to:

- CMX (band), a Finnish rock band
- CMX (DVD) by CMX
- CMX (comics), a manga brand by DC Comics
- Corel Presentation Exchange (CMX), a Corel Metafile Exchange file format supported by CorelDRAW
- CMX Systems, a collaboration between CBS and Memorex which developed video editing systems in the 1970s
- A video Edit decision list format
- The IATA code (International Air Transport Association) for Houghton County Memorial Airport near Calumet, Michigan
- 910 in Roman numerals
- Short name given to Carrickmacross by locals
- The brand used by Cinemex for their United States locations
