= CMX 600 =

Early non-linear video editing system, 1971

The CMX 600 was the first non-linear video editing system. The system was introduced in 1971 by CMX Systems, a joint venture between CBS and Memorex. CMX referred to it as a "RAVE", or Random Access Video Editor.

The 600 had a console with 2 black & white monitors built in, as well as a light pen used to control the system. The right monitor, which played the preview video, was used by the editor to make cuts and edit decisions, by using the light pen to select from options which were superimposed as text over the preview video. The left monitor was used to display the edited video.

It recorded and played back black-and-white "skip-field" video in analog on specially modified disk pack drives (supplied by Memorex, and which were commonly used to store data digitally on mainframe computers of the time) that were the size of washing machines. The audio was recorded digitally using PCM, and was recorded by being inserted in the "back porch" of the horizontal blanking interval pulses of the video (a technique known as "sound-in-sync"). This audio was somewhat poor, due to a large amount of jitter occurring from the signal being played back from the disk packs. The video was also of less than stellar quality, due to it being recorded in skip-field mode (which was done to extend recording time on the disk packs). But all of this did not matter, since the 600's main purpose was solely for off-line editing, in order to create an Edit Decision List (EDL) for later on-line editing.

The 600 was paired with the CMX-200, which took the EDL information from the 600 (stored on punched paper tape), and used it to control several video tape recorders (VTRs) to auto-assemble the video program in the on-line editing stage. The 200 used a Teletype Model 33 ASR terminal to read the punched tape containing the EDL information.

The editing console was interfaced to two equipment racks of support equipment (which were usually located remotely in another room from the console). The first rack contained the interface electronics for the system, monitoring equipment, and a Digital PDP-11 minicomputer with 32 kilobytes of RAM, which controlled the system. The second rack contained all the audio & video electronics, and the "Skip-Field Recorder", which took in video & audio for editing from a VTR, and then recorded such to one or several disk pack drives interfaced to the 600. The CMX 600 could support up to six disk pack drives, for a total recording time of 27 minutes. Each disk pack could record up to 5.4 minutes of NTSC video, or 4.5 minutes of PAL video.

The CMX 600 was a system quite ahead of the technology of the time, and was quite expensive, costing about $250,000 USD at its introduction. About 6 systems were manufactured, and were used to edit several television shows and commercials.

== See also ==
- Adrian Ettlinger, an engineer at CBS who conceived and lead the development of the CMX 600.
- See CMX Editing Systems page on Wikipedia.
