= Spotting (filmmaking) =

Process of deciding where music and sound effects go in a film

Spotting is the process, in the motion-picture and video production industries, of deciding where within a film the musical score and sound effects will be located, a process often referred to as "spotting for sound".

== Process ==
Spotting takes place once the director has "locked" the film, meaning that no more shot changes will be made (see picture lock). It is typically carried out in a viewing session in which the film is watched and discussed, often involving the director, the composer, the editor and the sound team. Music and sound effects may be spotted in separate sessions.

== Spotting sheets ==
The results of spotting are "spotting sheets", which contain the time cues – organized by scene, shot, and time code reference – that will subsequently be useful to those artists contributing to the project's sound design. After being locked and spotted, the cut goes into postproduction.

== See also ==
- Picture lock
- Film score
- Sound design
- Music supervisor
