= U-matic =

Videocassette format; the first of its kind

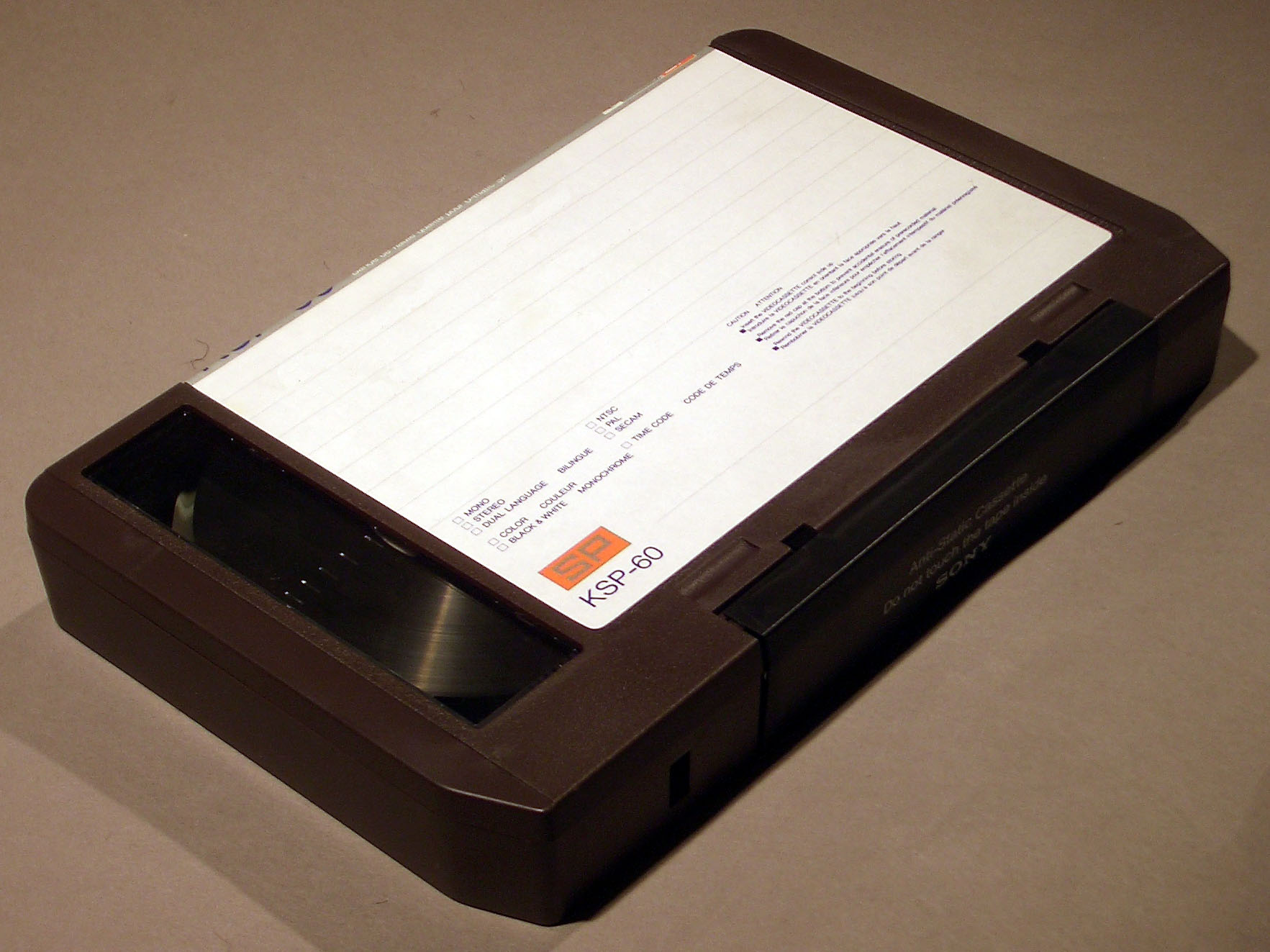
- Sony U-matic cassette
- Media type: Magnetic cassette tape, ¾-inch
- Encoding: NTSC, PAL, SECAM
- Read mechanism: Helical scan drum
- Write mechanism: Helical scan drum
- Developed by: Sony
- Usage: Video production
- Released: September 1971
- Discontinued: June 2004; Technical support: 2016

3/4-inch Type E Helical Scan or SMPTE E is an analog recording videocassette format marketed by Sony Electronics Corporation, Matsushita Electric Industrial Co. (Panasonic) and Victor Co. of Japan (JVC). It was initially developed by Sony and shown as a prototype in October 1969, refined and standardized among the three manufacturers in March 1970, and introduced commercially in September 1971 by Sony. The format was branded U-matic by Sony, U-Vision by Panasonic and U-VCR by JVC, referring to the U-shaped tape path as it threads around the video drum.

The format was among the earliest video formats to house videotape inside a cassette, replacing the reel-to-reel systems common at the time. The format uses 3/4-inch-wide (19 mm) tape, earning it the nickname "three-quarter-inch" or simply "three-quarter," in contrast to larger open-reel formats like 1 in (25 mm) Type C videotape and 2 in (51 mm) quadruplex videotape.

== Development ==
Logo of Panasonic U-Vision

Logo of JVC U-VCR

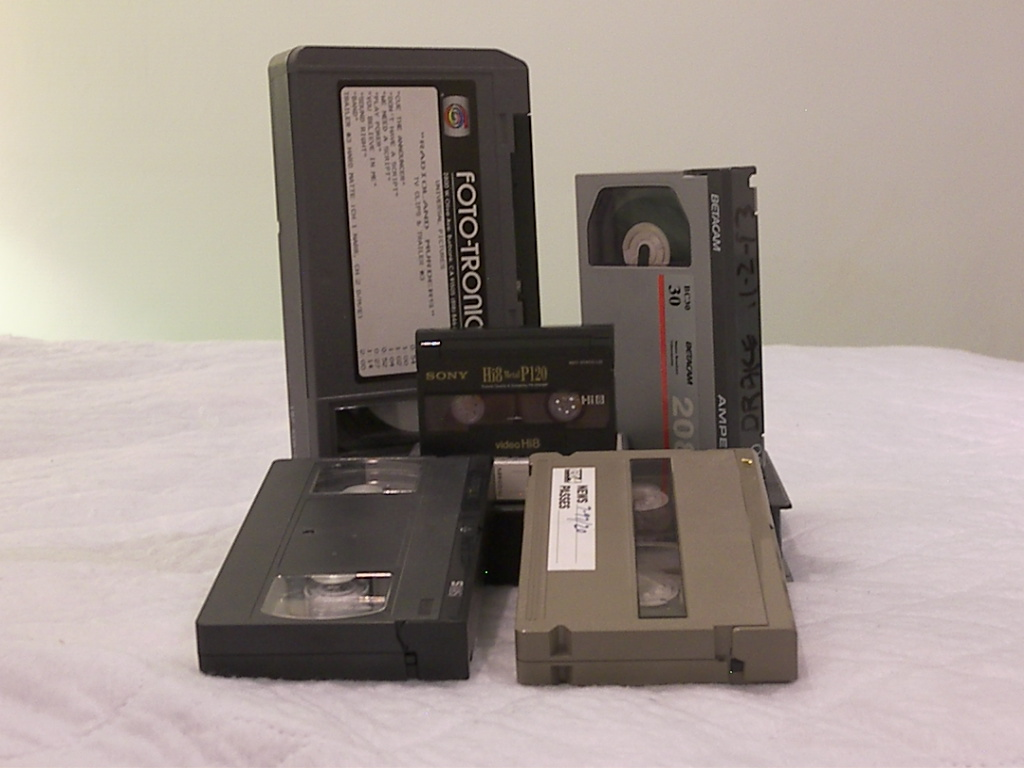
U-matic (back row, left) compared to Video8 (center) small Betacam tape (back, right), VHS (front, left) and MII (front, right)

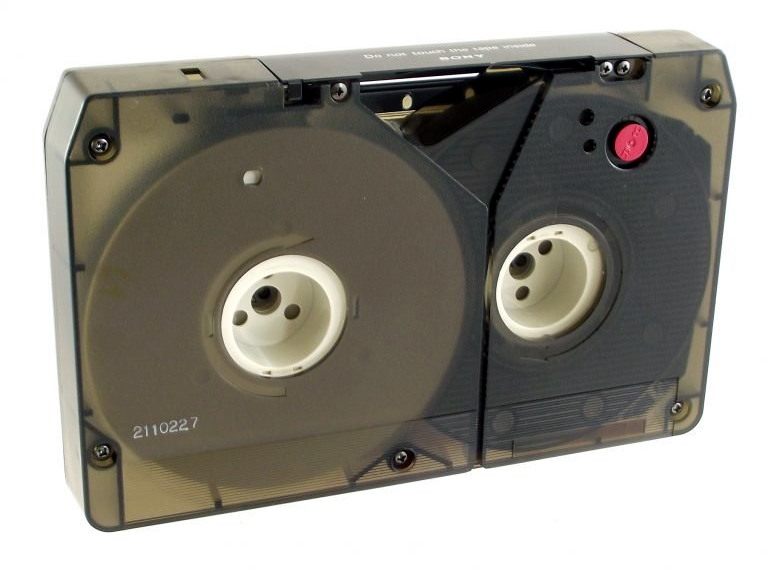
Large U-matic cassette

The first generation of U-matic VCRs are large devices, approximately 30 in (76 cm) wide, 24 in (61 cm) deep, and 12 in (30 cm) high, requiring special shelving, and had mechanical controls limited to Record, Play, Rewind, Fast-Forward, Stop and Pause (with muted video on early models). Later models sported improvements such as chassis sized for EIA 19-inch rack mounting, with sliding rack rails for compressed storage in broadcast environments, solenoid control mechanics, jog-shuttle knob, remote controls, Vertical Interval Time Code (VITC), longitudinal time code, internal cuts-only editing controls, "Slo-Mo" slow-motion playback, and Dolby audio noise reduction.

U-matic was named after the shape of the tape path when it was threaded around the helical-scan video head drum, which resembles the letter U. Betamax uses a similar type of "B-load" as well. Recording time is limited to one hour. It initially had a resolution of 240 lines. Signals are recorded onto the tape using frequency modulation.

U-matic tape moves at 3.75 inches per second, and has a tape writing speed of 8.54 meters per second for PAL or 10.26 for NTSC. This means that the heads on the drums of U-matic VCRs move across the tape at one of those speeds. The drum has two heads, each head records one complete field of interlaced video. The drum spins at 1500 rpm for PAL or 1800 rpm for NTSC.

Some of the standards that define the format, are:

- SMPTE 21M-1997 Video Recording – 3/4-in Type E Helical Scan – Records
- SMPTE 22M-1997 Video Recording – 3/4-in Type E Helical Scan – Cassette
- SMPTE 31M-2003 Television Analog Recording - 3/4-in Type E – Small Video Cassette
- RP 87-1999 (Archived 2004) Reference Carrier Frequencies, Preemphasis Characteristic and Audio and Control Signals for 3/4-in Type E Helical-Scan Video Tape Cassette Recording

=== U-matic Hi-band ===
U-matic saw two revisions to improve its image quality. In 1976, Sony introduced the semi backwards-compatible High-band or Hi-band revision, with the original version becoming known as Low-band or Lo-band. It increased the FM carrier frequencies, increasing the available bandwidth on the tape, hence increasing image quality and the number of resolution lines. U-matic Hi-band recordings will play in black and white in U-matic Lo-band machines.

PAL U-matic Hi-band increased the FM carrier frequency to 4.8–6.4 MHz. When recording it had a sync tip frequency of 4.8 MHz, a peak white frequency of 6.4 MHz, and a color carrier frequency of 983.803 kHz.

=== U-matic Hi-Band SP ===
Logo of U-matic SP

Hi-band was followed by SP (superior performance). It increased the FM carrier frequencies, increasing the available bandwidth on the tape, hence increasing image quality and resolution to 330 lines. U-matic SP introduced chrome dioxide tape.

PAL U-matic Hi-band SP increased the FM carrier frequency further to 5.6–7.2 MHz, while increasing the color carrier frequency to 924 kHz.

U-matic Lo-band when recording NTSC has a sync tip frequency of 3.8 MHz, a peak white frequency of 5.4 MHz, and a color carrier frequency of 688.373 kHz. NTSC U-matic SP has a peak white frequency of 7 MHz.

When recording PAL, U-matic Hi-Band SP had a sync tip frequency of 5.6 MHz, and a peak white frequency of 7.2 MHz, retaining the color carrier frequency of regular Hi-band.

== Introduction ==
At the 1971 introduction of the first model of U-Matic VCR, the VO-1600, Sony originally intended it to be a videocassette format oriented at the consumer market, even including a VHF/UHF TV tuner built into the model for home television recording. This proved to be something of a failure, because of the high manufacturing cost and resulting retail price of the format's first VCRs. But the cost was affordable enough for industrial and institutional customers, where the format was very successful for such applications as business communication and educational television. As a result, Sony shifted U-Matic's marketing to the industrial, professional, and educational sectors.

U-Matic saw even more success from the television broadcast industry in the mid-1970s, when a number of local TV stations and national TV networks used the format when its first portable model, the Sony VO-3800, was released in 1974. This model ushered in the era of ENG, or electronic news gathering, which eventually made obsolete the previous 16mm film cameras normally used for on-location television news gathering. Compared to film, which required developing which took time, the instantly available playback of videotape made faster breaking news possible.

== Cassettes ==
Logo of U-matic S

The original cassette employed only one flange for each reel - top flange on the pickup reel and bottom flange on the supply reel. This allowed the reels to overlap like in Compact Cassette, making the design more space-efficient. JVC explored a similar approach for an early version of VHS cassette, but abandoned it in favor of full-flanged cassette, because such an arrangement created unnecessary friction between the edge of the tape and the inner surface of the cassette. In the U-Matic cassette friction was reduced by the reels, having overlapping flanges, rotating in the opposite direction during playback, fast-forward, and rewind — one clockwise, the other counterclockwise. Each cassette has an internal locking mechanism that secures the tape hubs during transport, and a spring-loaded door that protects the tape; this door automatically opens when the cassette is inserted into a VCR. To prevent accidental recording, cassettes came with a removable red plastic button on the bottom—removing it disabled the record function.

A smaller cassette officially known as U-Matic S, developed for use in portable recorders, acquired traditional double-flange reels, which reduced the amount of tape that could be loaded, and as such, the duration of recording. U-Matic S tapes had a maximum recording time of 20 minutes, and large ones 1-hour, although some tape manufacturers such as 3M came out with 30-minute S-tapes and 75-minute large cassettes (and DuPont even managed 90-minute tapes) by using a thinner tape. It was the U-Matic S-format decks that ushered in the beginning of ENG, or electronic news gathering. To minimize weight and bulk in the field, portable recorders had an external AC power supply, or could be operated from rechargeable nickel-cadmium batteries. S-format tapes could be played back in older top-loading standard U-Matic decks with the aid of an adapter (the KCA-1 from Sony) which fitted around an S-sized tape; newer front-loading machines can accept S-format tapes directly, as the tapes have a slot on the underside that rides along a tab.

== Models ==
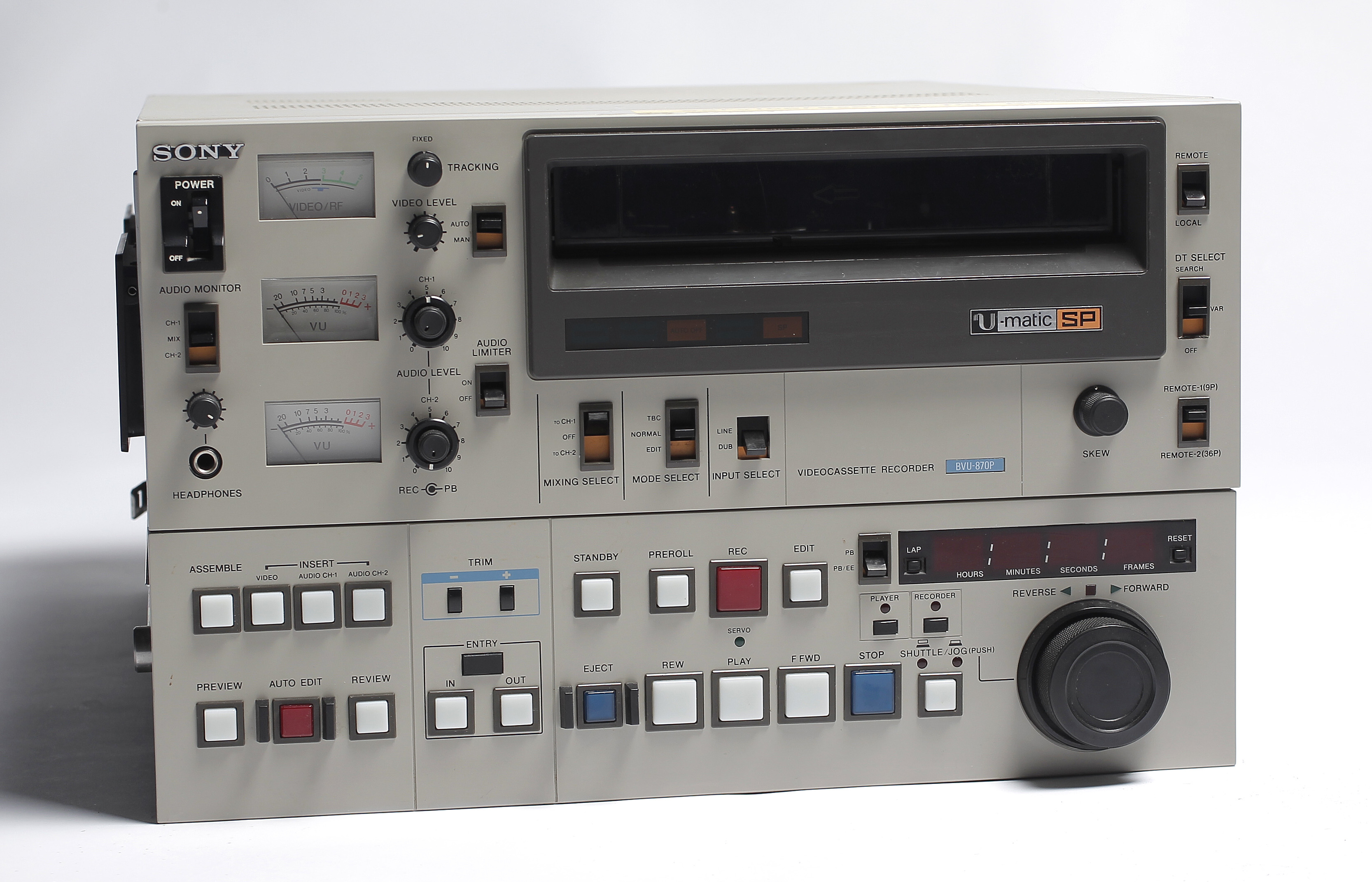
Sony U-matic SP tape recorder

Panasonic U-Vision NV-2125 with optional remote control unit NV-A150

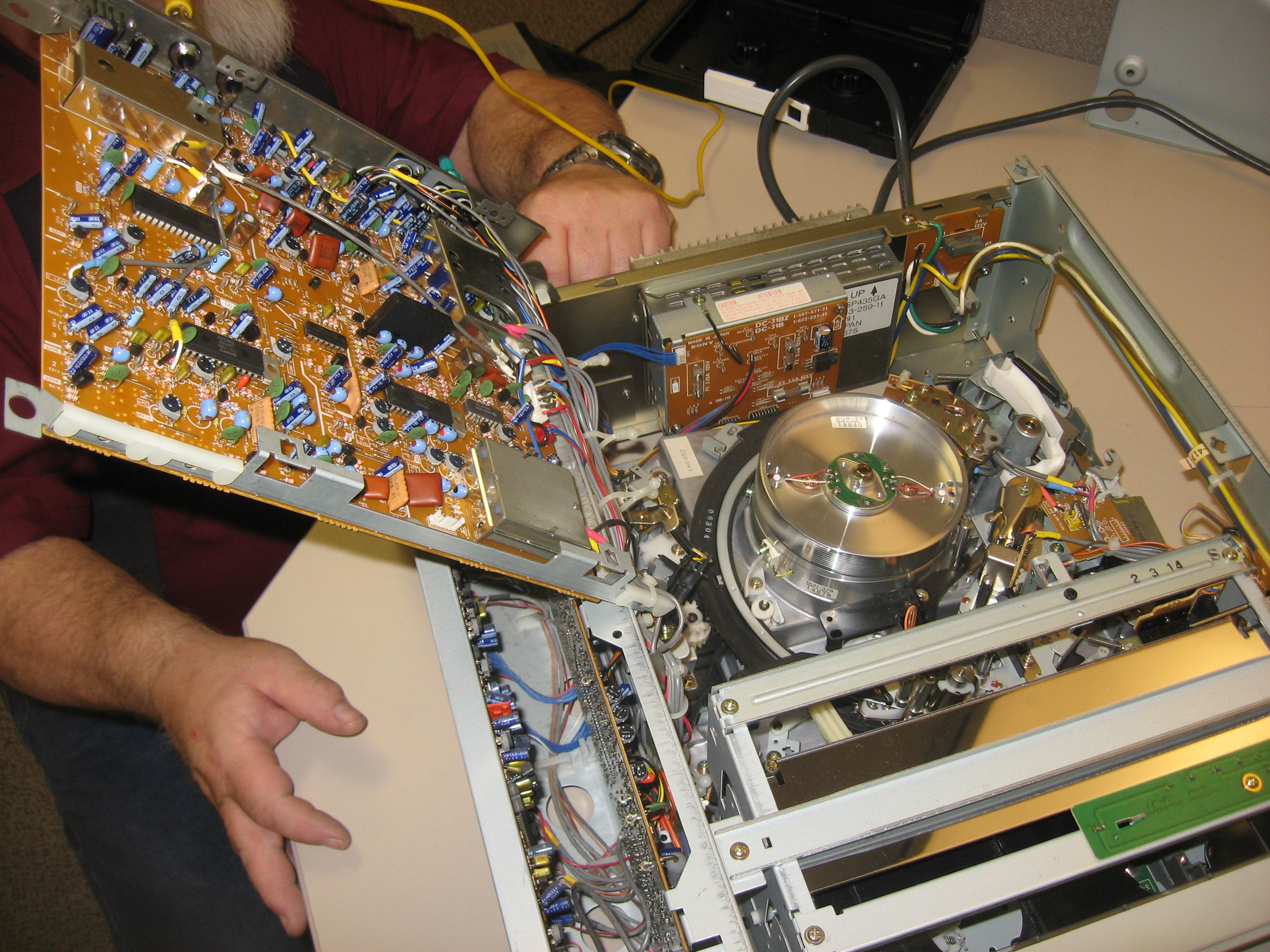
A U-matic player, disassembled for repair

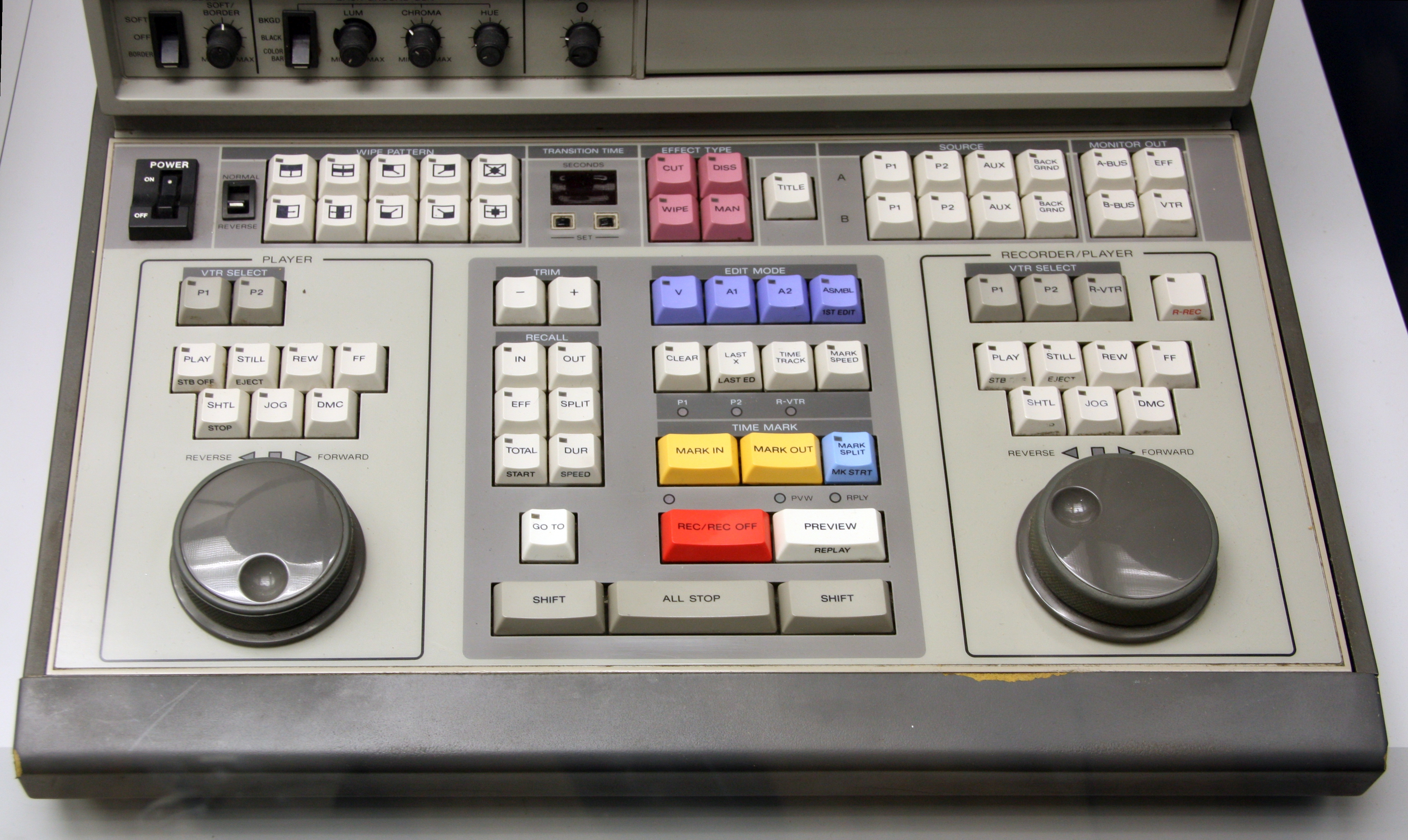
Sony editing console BVE-600 for controlling two connected U-matic video recorders. Such assemblies were used for professional video editing in TV studios etc.

The aforementioned Sony VO-3800, as well as the later VO-4800, VO-6800, VO-8800, BVU-50, BVU-100, BVU-110, and BVU-150 models from Sony, among others from Sony, Panasonic, JVC and other manufacturers used the smaller U-Matic S cassette.

The price of the VO family was primarily oriented toward educational, corporate and industrial fields, featured unbalanced audio connectors, and did not typically include SMPTE time code (although one or two companies offered after-market modification services to install longitudinal time code). The VO-3800 was largely metal, which made the unit heavy, but still technically portable. The VO-4800 had the same functionality as the VO-3800, but at a greatly reduced weight and size, by replacing many components with plastic. The VO-6800 added the improvement of a long, thin battery standard ("candy bars") that permitted storage of the batteries in a trouser pocket. Common model numbers for these batteries were NP-1, NP-1A and NP-1B. The VO-8800 was the last of the portable VO series to be produced by Sony, and featured solenoid-controlled transport.

The Sony BVU family (Broadcast Video U-matic) added longitudinal and vertical interval SMPTE time code, balanced audio XLR connectors, and heavier-duty transport features. The BVU-50 enabled recording in the field but not playback, and the BVU-100 permitted both recording and playback in the field. Portable recorders were connected to the camera with a multi-conductor cable terminated with multi-pin connectors on each end. The cable carried bi-directional audio, video, synchronisation, record on/off control, and power. Early studio and all portable U-Matic VCRs had a drawer-type mechanism which required the tape to be inserted, followed by manual closure of the drawer (a "top-loading" mechanism). Later studio VCRs accepted the cassette from a port opening and the cassette was pulled into and seated in the transport (a "front-loading" mechanism).

Some U-Matic VCRs could be controlled by external video editing controllers, such as the cuts-only Sony RM-440 for linear video editing systems. Sony and other manufacturers, such as Convergence, Calaway, and CMX Systems, produced A/B roll systems, which permitted two or more VCRs to be controlled and synchronised for video dissolves and other motion effects, integration of the character generator, audio controllers and digital video effects (DVE).

In 1976, Sony introduced the semi backwards-compatible High-band or Hi-band revision, with the introduction of the top-loading BVU-200. The original version became known as Low-band or Lo-band. U-matic Hi-band had an improved colour recording system and lower noise levels. BVU gained immense popularity in ENG and location programme-making, spelling the end of 16 mm film in everyday production. By the early 1990s, Sony's 1/2 in (1.3 cm) Betacam SP format had all but replaced BVU outside of corporate and budget programme making. With BVU-870, Sony made a final revision to U-matic, by further improving the recording system and giving it the same "SP" suffix as Betacam. SP had a horizontal resolution of 330 lines. The BVU-800 series Y-FM carrier frequency was upped to 1.2 MHz giving it wider bandwidth. The BVU-800 series also added Dolby audio noise reduction. Sony's BVU-900 series were the last broadcast U-matic VTRs made by Sony. First-generation U-matic SP and Beta-SP recordings were hard to tell apart, but despite this the writing was on the wall for U-matic, due to intrinsic problems with the format.

== Problems ==
A recurring problem with the format was damage to the videotape caused by prolonged friction of the spinning video drum heads against a paused videocassette. The drum would rub oxide off the tape or the tape would wrinkle; when the damaged tape was played back, a horizontal line of distorted visual image would ascend in the frame, and audio would drop out. Manufacturers attempted to minimize this issue with schemes in which the tape would loosen around the spinning head or the head would stop spinning after resting in pause mode for a pre-determined period of time.

The format video image also suffered from head-switching noise, a distortion of the image in which a section of video at the bottom of the video frame would be horizontally askew from the larger portion.

The format also had difficulties with reproducing the red color on the NTSC color standard, and red images would be noisier than other colors in the spectrum. For this reason, on-camera talent was discouraged from wearing red clothing that would call attention to technical shortcomings.

Copying video from one U-matic VCR to another compromised playback reliability, and levels of head-switching noise, chroma smearing, and chroma noise compounded with every generation. These issues motivated videotape editors and engineers to use work-arounds to minimise this degradation. A time-base corrector (TBC) could be used to regenerate the sync tip portion of the video signal sent to the "recording" VCR, improving playback reliability. The "dub" cable, more formally called "demodulated" (or "demod" for short), was a multi-conductor cable that circumvented a portion of the video circuitry, minimising amplification noise.

== Uses ==
For synchronisation to broadcast or post-production editing house genlock systems, U-Matic VCRs required a time base corrector (TBC). Some TBCs had a drop-out compensation (DOC) circuit which would hold lines of video in temporary digital memory to compensate for oxide drop-out or wrinkle flaws in the videotape, however the DOC circuits required several cables and expert calibration for use.

U-matic tapes were also used for easy transport of filmed scenes for dailies in the days before VHS, DVD, and portable hard drives. Several movies have surviving copies in this form. The first rough cut of Apocalypse Now, for example (the raw version of what became Apocalypse Now Redux), survived on three U-Matic cassettes.

Audio quality was compromised due to the use of longitudinal audio tape heads in combination with slow tape speed. Sony eventually implemented Dolby noise reduction circuitry (using Dolby C) to improve audio fidelity.

The 2012 film No, set in 1980s Chile, used U-matic tape for filming.

== Digital audio ==
U-matic was also used for the storage of digital audio data. Most digital audio recordings from the 1980s were recorded on U-matic tape via a Sony PCM-1600, -1610, or -1630 PCM adaptor. These devices accepted stereo analogue audio, digitized it, and generated "pseudo video" from the bits, storing 96 bits—three stereo pairs of 16-bit samples—as bright and dark regions along each scan line. (On a monitor the "video" looked like vibrating checkerboard patterns.) This could be recorded on a U-matic recorder. This was the first system used for mastering audio compact discs in the early 1980s. The famous compact disc 44.1 kHz sampling rate was based on a best-fit calculation for PAL and monochrome NTSC video's horizontal line period and rate and U-matic's luminance bandwidth. On playback, the PCM adapter converted the light and dark regions back into bits. Glass masters for audio CDs were made via laser from the PCM-1600's digital output to a photoresist- or dye-polymer-coated disc. This method was common until the mid-1990s.

== Decline of use ==
JVC U-VCR advertisement from 1986

U-matic is no longer used as a mainstream television production format, but it found lasting appeal as a cheap, well specified, and hard-wearing format. The format permitted many broadcast and non-broadcast institutions to produce television programming on an accessible budget, spawning programming distribution, classroom playback, etc. At its peak popularity, U-matic recording and playback equipment was manufactured by Sony, Panasonic and JVC, with many spin-off product manufacturers, such as video edit controllers, time base correctors, video production furniture, playback monitors and carts, etc.

Many television facilities the world over still have a U-matic recorder for archive playback of material recorded in the 1970s and 1980s. For example, the US Library of Congress facility in Culpeper, Virginia, holds thousands of titles on U-matic video as a means of providing access copies and proof for copyright deposit of old television broadcasts and films.
