= B-roll =

Concept in filmmaking

B-roll video of computer server racks

In filmmaking and video production, B-roll, B roll, B-reel or B reel is supplemental or alternative footage intercut with the main shot. The term A-roll, referring to main footage, has fallen out of use to some degree.

== Film and video production ==
On Bonanza, for example, the whole team will go out on location for two or three weeks in a season to shoot miles of stock footage for twenty or more episodes. The Cartwright brothers will be filmed from all angles, riding across plains, through gullies, up hills and across rivers; selected clips can then be inserted as appropriate in future episodes. To ensure continuity, the brothers always wear exactly the same clothes and ride the same horses year in, year out. If the story calls for one of them to be riding by a lake, a snippet of film shot perhaps two or three years earlier can be dug out as their appearance is unchanged.

— Timothy Green, 1972

Films and videos may cut away from the main story to show related scenery or action. Establishing shots may be used to show the audience the context of the story. These secondary images are often presented without sound, or with very low level sound, as the sound from the primary footage is expected to continue while the other images are shown. The various shots presented without sound are called B-roll.

B-roll may be shot by smaller second unit crews, since there is no need for sound. In film, smaller MOS cameras, lacking sound circuitry, may be used for greater portability and ease of setup. In electronic news-gathering (ENG) and documentary film projects, B-roll footage is often shot after the main interview is shot, to provide supporting scenes for what was said by the interview subject. In a docudrama project, B-roll may refer to dramatic re-enactment scenes staged by the producer and performed by actors, to be used as cutaway shots.

There are many different types of B-roll, including: insert shots, FX shots, establishing shots, stock footage, and pickup shots.

B-roll footage may be added to or drawn from a stock footage library.

== History ==
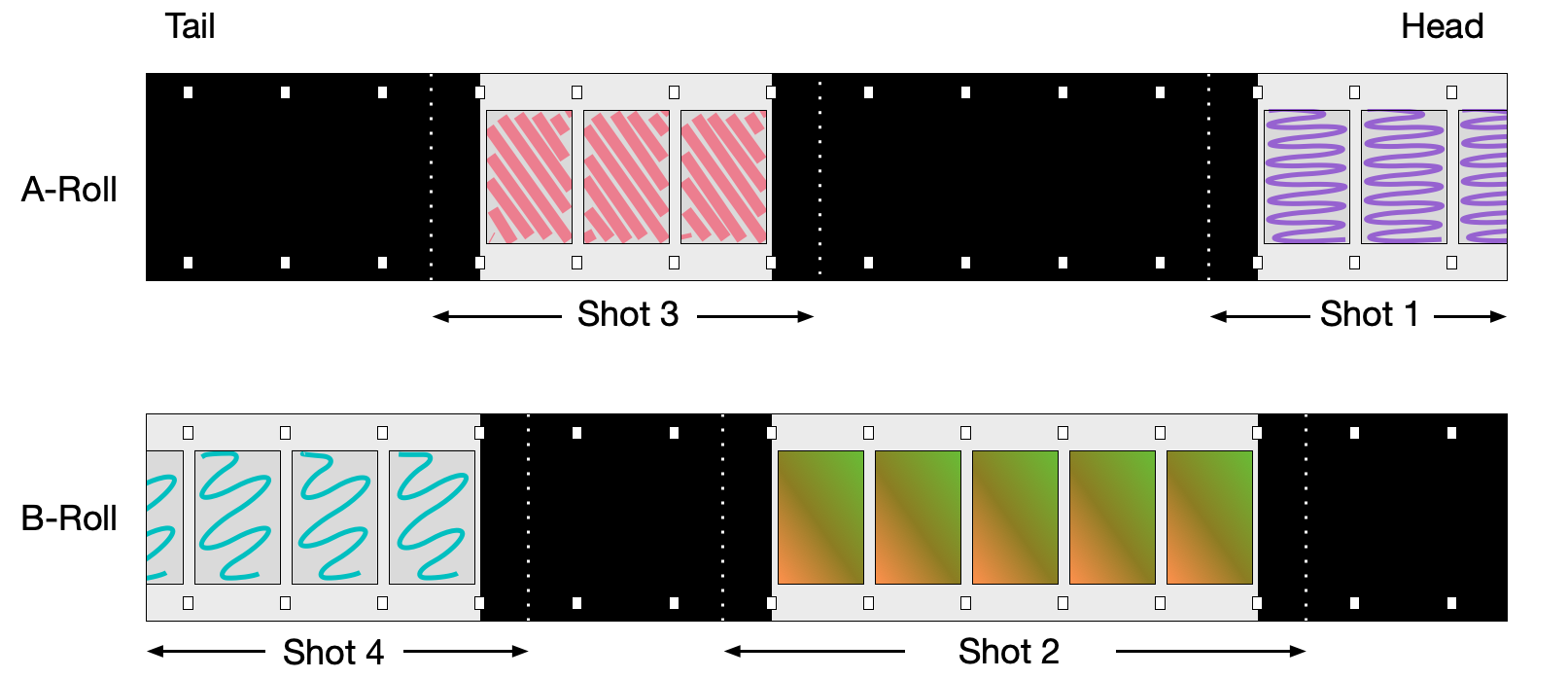
Layout with 4 shots.

The term B-roll originates from a particular solution to the problem of visible splices in the narrow film stock used in 16 mm film. 35 mm film was wide enough to hide splices, but 16 mm film revealed the splices as flaws in the picture. To avoid this problem, the intended shots were spliced to opaque black leader, with the black leader hiding the splice. Two sequences of shots were assembled, the odd-numbered shots on the A-roll, and the even-numbered shots on the B-roll, such that all of the shots on one roll were matched by black leader on the other roll, in a checkerboard pattern (an alternate name for the process was "checkerboard printing".) Unexposed 16 mm raw print stock was exposed twice, once to the A-roll, then it was exposed again to the B-roll.

Until the mid-1970s, news teams shot both main A-roll and secondary B-roll footage on 16 mm film. Sound was integrated onto the film by way of a magnetic stripe at the edge of the film. The A-roll and B-roll scenes, shot at 24 frames per second, were converted to the television frame rate of 30 fps using a telecine system consisting of two film projectors, one showing the main A-roll footage and the other showing the B-roll. The sound from the A-roll footage was used, or sound from narration or voiceover, while MOS images from the B-roll were intercut as desired.

In the 1980s, the term B-roll was adopted for linear video editing using at least two video tape machines. Traditionally, the tape decks in an edit suite were labeled by letter, with the 'A' deck being the one containing the main tape upon which the main action material was shot. The 'B' deck was used to run tapes that held additional footage such as establishing shots, cutaway shots, and any other supporting footage. The sound was usually taken from the A deck alone, so that the B deck provided video without sound. As linear editing systems were unable to dissolve between clips on the same tape, an edit decision list (EDL) was used to mark clips as "A-roll" and "B-roll" to indicate source machines.

== See also ==
- Camera coverage
- Pick-up (filmmaking)
- A-side and B-side
