= Shot logging =

Process of capturing metadata in a film or video shoot

In filmmaking and video production, shot logging is the process by which shoot metadata is captured during a film or video shoot. During the shoot, the camera assistant typically logs the start and end timecodes of shots, and the data generated is sent on to the editorial department for use in referencing those shots. At the same time, information such as scene/slate number, camera ID and take is noted. Where there are other technical systems producing metadata, their timecodes and settings are also noted.

Non-technical information such as continuity and take selection information is usually recorded as part of the same process.

This shot logging process was traditionally done by hand using pen and paper, and is now typically done using shot-logging software running on a laptop computer that is connected to the time code generator or the camera itself. Modern digital cinema cameras, film cameras, professional video cameras, and 3D rigs typically have some form of technical data capture facility built in; the shot log information can be reconciled with the edit decision list (EDL) in the post-production process.

== See also ==
- Film editing
- Video editing
