= Adrian Ettlinger =

American electrical engineer and software developer

Adrian Ettlinger (January 26, 1925 – October 23, 2013) was an American electrical engineer and software developer and a pioneer in television and video technology. He has been described as a "visionary" and the "legendary" "engineering father" of non-linear video editing, and has been recognized for his contributions to a range of technologies important to the advancement of television and video as well as several other accomplishments.

== Early life ==
Ettlinger was born on January 26, 1925, and studied Electrical Engineering at Purdue University, graduating in 1944.

== Family ==
Adrian Ettlinger's parents were Eli and Ruth Ettlinger, his sister Geraldine. He was married to Carol Burns Ettlinger and had two children: Michael Ettlinger and Amanda. He was also the nephew of Hyman Ettlinger who served on the Math faculty and as a football coach at the University of Texas for many years and authored notable math text books.

== Work at CBS ==
Ettlinger entered the world of television engineering when he joined the Columbia Broadcasting System (CBS) as an electrical engineer. While at CBS, among other innovations, he:

- Led the development of the first computerized on-air television switching control system.
- Conceptualized and was the project coordinator for the first practical stop-action instant replay system. He accepted the Emmy award for this invention at the 1966 ceremonies.
- Developed the first advanced computer-controlled theater lighting system which was the first to use a video display.
- Conceived and led the development of the first non-linear video editing system: the Emmy Award-winning CMX 600.

== Post-CBS Video Editing and Lighting Control Work ==
After leaving CBS in 1970, Ettlinger worked as a consultant and with several technology companies. Skirpan Lighting Control marketed the lighting system that he had developed while at CBS after CBS chose not to pursue commercial applications. Installations of the system included Wolf Trap Farm Park outside Washington DC, all three of the major television networks of the time, as well as other theatrical installations. He also participated in the development of the "CBS-Sony" editing system.

He then developed the "Ediflex" video editing system and co-founded the company Cinedco to market it. This system received an Emmy award in 1986, was widely used in both television and film productions, and was important to the broadening acceptance and use of non-linear video editing.

== Awards and recognition ==
Ettlinger was the 1976 recipient of the David Sarnoff Medal from the Society of Motion Picture and Television Engineers. The Sarnoff medal is awarded annually for contributions to television engineering. He was given the award ”[f]or his important contributions to the application of computers to on-air television station switching control, for conceiving of the application of video disc stop-action systems to sports broadcasts, and for contributions to computer control of studio lighting systems and videotape editing systems.”

In 1996 Videography magazine, in its 20th anniversary publication The Age of Videography, named Ettlinger as one of the 18, then-living, "People Who Made a Difference" in video production technology, calling him "[t]he father of modern video post [production]." He was profiled in Post: The Magazine for Post Production Professionals as "The Father of Electronic Editing."

== To Every U.S. County and other accomplishments ==
After retiring from the television industry Ettlinger engaged in a number of other projects of note. In July 1993 he completed a decades-long effort of visiting every county in the United States, with the last being Blanco County, TX. In honor of this accomplishment Ettlinger and his wife, Carol Burns Ettlinger, were made honorary citizens of the county by Judge Charles Scott.

Ettlinger had also walked every street in Manhattan end-to-end in the 1950s into the early 1960s. Another earlier activity was running as the Democratic candidate for mayor of Hastings-on-Hudson, New York, in 1971, advocating for a local fair housing ordinance. He also served as chairman of the Hastings-on-Hudson, New York Democratic Committee.

=== AniMap ===
In connection with his interest in counties, Ettlinger developed the program AniMap which allows the user to see the county outline map of any state in any year. This has proved useful for those studying genealogy.

=== FreeCell-related Research and Development ===
Another post-career project was co-authoring of an enhanced FreeCell implementation called FreeCell Pro. FreeCell Pro was inspired by the FreeCell implementation that shipped with Microsoft Windows, and tried to stay compatible with it, but does not share code. FreeCell Pro provides many features useful to FreeCell researchers, including integration with some automated FreeCell solvers, starting from an enhanced version of the Freecell solver written by Don Woods.

=== Railroads ===
Ettlinger also had a lifelong interest in railroads. He authored a number of the entries in the Encyclopedia of North American Railroads, developed software that allows the user to see the railroad map of southern New England for any year and was the webmaster for the Railway and Locomotive Historical Society and the New York Railroad Enthusiasts, and a member of the Lexington Group.

== Death ==
On October 23, 2013 Adrian Ettlinger died peacefully at home in Carmel NY. The cause was congestive heart failure.
