= Strassner Editing Systems =

PC-based linear video editing controllers

Strassner Editing Systems (SES) was a line of PC-based linear "CMX style" keyboard video editing controllers invented in 1988 by Norman H. Strassner in Los Angeles, California.

== Videotape Editing ==
During the mid-1980s, the linear videotape editing systems were run on industrial computers known as RT-11. They were bulky and expensive, but the computers were very stable and reliable. Before floppy disks were available, programs were loaded by punch tape, a slow process that could be hindered by physical damage to the paper tape. Eventually, programs were loaded with 8" floppy disks. Most editing controllers at the time were QWERTY keyboard based, meaning that all functions were controlled via a computer keyboard, usually with color-coded, labeled key caps.

Mr. Strassner originally wrote a computer program for PCs that would manage edit decision lists that kept a record of all edits, but was not an editing controller. Mr. Strassner then extended the user of the software and made it into a complete editing controller for VTRs, audio and video switchers and special effect devices. There were several companies using a keyboard-oriented editing system at the time, including CMX and Grass Valley.

== Technology ==
What made Strassner Editing System different was that it was written for a PC, not an RT-11 computer. This brought the cost of the system way down, and afforded multiple use options for the editing computer, as it was not longer proprietary and was easily upgraded. The system use Videomedia's Vlans, a distributed system whereby commands were sent out by the PC to satellite modules connected to VTRs, switchers, etc.

== History ==
In 1995, that Strassner sold the company to a San Jose-based company - Videomedia, Inc., makers of the "V-LAN" hardware he used to physically control video tape machines (VTRs), video and audio switchers and special effects devices.

At the time Strassner wrote the software, he was a working editor in Hollywood for shows like Entertainment Tonight and Real People, and companies like Paramount Pictures, CBS, NBC and Smith-Hemion.

Strassner Editing Systems were used to edit many popular television shows and motion pictures, including MTV's "Real World", The Muppets and the first Muppet Movie.

The success of Strassner Editing Systems was due to Strassner's own expertise as both an off-line and on-line video tape editor. His "wish list" of features were incorporated into his systems, which made him a local hero for editors in Hollywood.

== See also ==
- Linear Video Editing
- CMX Systems

Other "CMX-Style" editing systems:

- Grass Valley Editing Systems
