= Online editing (video production) =

Online editing is a post-production linear video editing process that is performed in the final stage of a video production. It occurs after offline editing. For the most part, online editing has been replaced by video editing software that operate on non-linear editing systems (NLE). High-end post-production companies still use the Offline-Online Editing workflow with NLEs.

The term online originated in the telecommunication industry, meaning "Under the direct control of another device" (automation). Online editors such as the Sony BVE-9000 edit control unit used the RS-422 remote control 9-Pin Protocol to allow the computer-interface of edit controllers to control video tape recorders (VTR) via a series of commands. The protocol supports a variety of devices including one-inch reel-to-reel type C videotape as well as videocassette recorders (VCR) to Fast-Forward, Rewind and Play and Record based on SMPTE time-code. The controllers have the ability to interface with professional audio equipment like audio mixers with console automation.

The video quality first introduced with Avid's Media Composer in 1989 was incapable of producing broadcast quality images due to computer processing limitations. The term 'Online' changed from its original meaning to where the pictures are re-assembled at full or 'online++' resolution. An edit decision list (EDL) or equivalent is used to carry over the cuts and dissolves created during the offline edit. This conform is checked against a video copy of the offline edit to verify that the edits are correct and frame-accurate. This work-print (cutting copy in the UK) also provides a reference for any digital video effects that need to be added.

After conforming the project, the online editor will add visual effects, lower third titles, and apply color correction. This process is typically supervised by the client(s). The editor will also ensure that the program meets the technical delivery broadcast safe specs of the broadcaster, ensuring proper video levels, aspect ratio, and blanking width.

Sometimes the online editor will package the show, putting together each version. Each version may have different requirements for the formatting (i.e. closed blacks), bumper music, use of a commercial bumper, different closing credits, etc.

Projects may be re-captured at the lowest level of video compression possible – ideally with no compression at all.
