= D/Vision Pro =

Computer Software

D/Vision Pro was one of the earliest marketed non-linear editing systems. It was released by TouchVision Systems, Inc. in the mid-1990s.

The program was DOS-based and worked on either Intel's 386 or 486 processor. The system used AVI compression and worked with the Action Media II board.

The system allowed users to digitize video, audio, and timecode, create an edit decision list (EDL), instantly play back the edited program, and output the finished EDL in a wide variety of formats.

These cost-effective editing systems were used by numerous independent filmmakers and in low-budget productions during the mid-late 1990s.

D/Vision Pro's low-quality compression led TouchVision (later renamed D/Vision Systems) to abandon it in favor of D/Vision Online, which was purchased by Discreet Logic and renamed edit*.

In June 2002, Discreet discontinued edit*, as they did not want it to interfere with smoke* sales which were more profitable. Discreet was later purchased by Autodesk.
