= Picture lock =

Stage prior to online editing in film production

Picture lock is a stage in editing a film or editing a television production. It is the stage prior to online editing when all changes to the film or television program cut have been done and approved. It is then sent to subsequent stages in the process, such as online editing and audio mixing. Any last-minute changes can force portions of subsequent work to be redone.

== Place in the post-production workflow ==
Picture lock usually follows the successive cuts of a film, such as the rough cut and later refinements of the edit. Once the picture is locked, work that depends on the exact length and timing of the picture, such as sound design, music scoring and final sound mixing, can proceed without the timing of scenes changing underneath it. Visual effects and colour work may also be finalised from the locked cut.

== Changes after picture lock ==
In practice, a locked picture is not always final. If a change is made after the lock, editors may produce a list of the differences between the old and new cut so that the other departments can update their work to match. The meaning and strictness of the term can vary between feature films, television and documentaries.

== See also ==
- Rough cut
- Film editing
- Offline editing
- Online editing
