= EditDroid =

Computerized analog non-linear editing system

The EditDroid is a computerized analog non-linear editing (NLE) system which was developed by Lucasfilm spin-off company, the Droid Works and Convergence Corporation who formed a joint venture company. The company existed up through the mid-'80s to the early '90s in an attempt to move from analog editing methods to digital. EditDroid debuted at the National Association of Broadcasters (NAB) 62nd Annual meeting in Las Vegas in 1984 concurrent with another editing tool that would compete with the EditDroid for all its years in production, the Montage Picture Processor.

The EditDroid was never a commercial success and after the close of The Droid Works in 1987 and subsequent redevelopment of the product for seven years, the software was eventually sold to Avid Technology in 1993. Only 24 EditDroid systems were ever produced.

== Features ==
The system is LaserDisc-based, relying on several LaserDisc players and a database system which queues up the clips in the order needed from the LaserDisc players in the most efficient way, so as to minimize skipping. This however isn't always possible. So if the edits aren't sufficiently close, the system isn't always fast enough to cue up the next clip.

It has three screens connected to it: one Sun-1 computer display as the graphical UI for the product, one small preview video monitor, and one large rear-projected monitor containing "the cut" which was controlled by a custom controller. The controller, called the TouchPad, features a KEM-style shuttle knob, a trackball, and a host of buttons with LED labels that changes in function depending on what the system was doing. The EditDroid pioneered the use of the graphical display for editing—introducing the timeline as well as digital picture icons to identify raw source clips.

Once the entire movie has been edited, an Edit Decision List of marked frames is turned over to a film laboratory where the actual pieces of film are spliced together in the correct order.

The EditDroid is obsolete by market standards, as the market for nonlinear editing systems has changed radically since its inception, with computer-based products like Adobe Premiere and Final Cut Pro ranging entirely from the consumer to professional markets. In many respects the EditDroid was a concept demonstration of the future of editing, with a LaserDisc being a good 1980s simulation of what digital access would eventually become, and an editing interface and workflow that was more like today's methods than any of the videotape linear or analog nonlinear products leading up to the Avid/1 in 1990.

== Advantages and disadvantages ==
There are numerous advantages of using a digital editing solution over the older analog solutions, such as the Moviola. Not only is it much faster to locate the clips needed, keeping track of what can in some cases amount to a staggering amount of footage, is also much easier digitally. Also, editing film digitally is a non-destructive process, whereas the analog process requires the actual cutting and taping together of pieces of film as well as manual syncing of sound.

Aside from the technological advantages of digital editing, in his book In the Blink of an Eye, editor Walter Murch mourns the loss of the older analog solutions. Analog editing requires the editor to frequently move back and forth or scrub in the source material to gain an overview, thus increasing one's familiarity with it. Since undoing an edit is such a laborious process, there is a high incentive to get the best edit cut the first time. This process which is not necessary to the same extent with NLE solutions in which one edit point can be made and undone very quickly.

Furthermore, LaserDisc has a fixed resolution, whereas film can be focused to look ideal at any display size.

While the LaserDisc format was brought to market in the late 1970s, first with the name of DiscoVision and later as LaserVision, and despite persistent promises from the Music Corporation of America, a cheap method of recording LaserDiscs never surfaced. This lack made it exceedingly difficult and cumbersome to create the needed LaserDiscs for the EditDroid. Also at this time, the storage available on a hard disk was prohibitively small and extremely expensive.

Furthermore, many potential customers of the EditDroid were disappointed by the fact that while Lucasfilm Ltd. were the creators of the EditDroid, George Lucas had never in fact used the EditDroid on a movie. This fact stood in contrast to the fact that the EditDroid had been shown with Return of the Jedi clips on numerous occasions at tradeshows and at demonstrations. Lucas eventually used his EditDroids in the early '90s on his series The Young Indiana Jones Chronicles.

== See also ==
- SoundDroid
