= Imix video cube =

The Imix (also known as ImMix) Video Cube is one of the first computer non-linear editing systems that was a full broadcast quality online video finishing machine. After its release in 1994, Imix released a more advanced version, the Imix Turbo Cube, which boasted 4 channels of real time layered visual effects. It was a hardware computer system controlled by an Apple Macintosh computer.
