= Offline editing =

Post production film process

Offline editing is the creative storytelling stage of filmmaking and television production where the structure, mood, pacing and story of the final show are defined. Many versions and revisions are presented and considered at this stage until the edit gets to a stage known as picture lock. This is when the process moves on to the next stages of post-production known as online editing, color grading and audio mixing.

Typically, during offline editing, all the original camera footage (often tens or hundreds of hours) is digitized into a non-linear editing system as a low resolution duplicate. The editor and director are then free to work with all the footage on assembly, creating a rough cut, and a final cut. Editing the copy allows multiple story and creative possibilities to be explored without affecting the camera original film stock or video tape. Once the project has been completely offline edited, the low resolution footage is replaced with the original high resolution media, or brought online.

Modern offline video editing is conducted using specialized computer hardware and video editing software known as a non-linear editing (NLE) suite, such as Adobe Premiere, Final Cut Pro, Avid Media Composer, DaVinci Resolve, Sony Vegas, Lightworks and VideoPad. The availability of more powerful digital editing systems has made the offline editing workflow process much quicker than the previous method of time-consuming (video tape to tape) linear video editing.

The term offline originated because the editing occurred offsite, in an office or home rather than at the post facility.

== History ==
=== From film to tape ===
Film editing used an offline approach almost from the beginning. Film editors worked with a workprint of the original film negative to protect the negative from handling damage. When two-inch quadraplex video tape recording was first introduced by Ampex in 1956, it could not be physically cut and spliced simply and cleanly as film negatives could be. One error-prone method option was to cut the tape with a razor blade. Since there was no visible frame line on the 2-inch-wide (51 mm) tape, a special ferrofluid developing solution was applied to the tape, allowing the editor to view the recorded control track pulse under a microscope, and thus determine where one frame ended and the next began. This process was not always exact, and if imperfectly performed would lead to picture breakup when the cut was played. Generally this process was used to assemble scenes together, not for creative editing.

The second option for video editing was to use two tape machines, one playing back the original tapes, and the other recording that playback. The original tapes were pre-rolled, manually cued to a few seconds prior to the start of a shot on the player, while the recorder was set to record. Each machine was rolled forward simultaneously, and a punch in recording, similar to punch in / out of early audio multitrack recordings, was made at the appropriate moment. Beyond not being very precise, recorders of this era cost much more than a house, making this process an expensive use of the machines. This technique of re-recording from source to edit master came to be known as linear video editing.

This was the way things were for television shows shot on tape for the first 15 years. Even such fast-paced shows as Rowan & Martin's Laugh-In continued to use the razor blade technique.

=== New technological developments ===
Three developments of the late sixties and early seventies revolutionized video editing, and made it possible for television to have its own version of the film workprint/conform process.

==== Time code ====
The first was the invention of time code. Whereas film negative had numbers printed optically along the side of the film, so that every frame could be identified exactly, video tape had no such system. Only video, audio, and a control pulse were recorded. Early attempts to rectify this were primitive to say the least. An announcer reciting the seconds was recorded onto an audio channel on the tape. Time code introduced frame precision, by recording a machine readable signal on an audio channel.

A time code reader device translated this signal into hours, minutes, seconds and frames, originally displayed on a Nixie tube display, and later with LED readouts. This innovation made it possible for the editor to note the exact frames at which to make a cut, and thus be much more precise. He could create a paper edit by writing down the numbers of the first and last frames of each shot, and then arrange them in order on paper prior to the actual edit session with the expensive VTRs.

==== Cheaper video recorders ====
Although video technology had the potential to be cheaper since it doesn't have the costs of film stock and have to go through the development process respectively, the quality of early video recording technology in the 1950s and even into the mid 1960s was often far too low to be taken seriously against the aesthetical look, familiarity and relative ease of editing of 16mm and 35mm film stock – which many television cinematographers used well up until the late 1980s in documentaries, dramas etc. before video technology caught up to being 'acceptable' as television cameras and camcorders eventually displaced film stock for regular television use, as they became lighter and more practical to take with them. Because early video cameras were so large and so expensive, it wasn't until 1984 with the JVC VHS-C camcorder that consumers had access to video tape technology.

Professionally, early video cameras were designated mostly for studio use, as up until the mid-1980s, when the camera unit and recorder unit merged as a camcorder (CAMera-reCORDER) as their bulky size made them far too big and bulky to be used outside against the smaller and more practical film camera.

For example, British sitcom Only Fools and Horses used videotape for internal scenes, but used film stock for external scenes for lighting reasons – it was difficult with tube sensors to get a stable, quality image without them needing a lot of lighting.

The second development was cheaper video recorders. Though not suitable for broadcast use directly, these provided a way to make a copy of the master, with its time code visibly inserted into a small box or 'time code window' in the picture. This tape could then be played in an office or at home on a video recorder costing only as much as a used car. The editor would note down the numbers of the shots and decide the order. They might simply write them in a list, or they might dub from one of these small machines to another to create a rough cut edit, and note the necessary frame numbers by watching this tape.

==== Exact editing ====
Though both of these developments helped greatly, effectively creating the offline editing method, they didn't solve the problem of precisely controlling the video recorder for frame accurate editing. That required precise control of the tape transport mechanism, using a dedicated edit controller that could read the time code and perform an edit exactly on cue.

That innovation came about as a result of research conducted by CMX, a joint venture of the CBS and Memorex corporations. The intent was to create a much less haphazard method of editing video directly that had all of the creative control of traditional film editing. The result, the CMX 600, accomplished this goal with a two part process. Camera master tapes were dubbed as black and white analog video to very large computer memory discs.

The editor could access any shot exactly, and quickly edit a precise black and white, low quality version of the program. More importantly, re-editing was trivial, as no cuts were actually performed. The shots were simply accessed and played in sequence from the disc in real time. The computer kept track of all the numbers in this offline stage of the process, and when the editor was satisfied, output them as an Edit decision list (EDL).

This EDL was used in the final stage of the process, the online edit. To make it work, special computer to video tape recorder (VTR) edit interfaces had to be developed, called I-Squareds. Under the control of a computer reading back the EDL and communications protocols, these I-Squareds took control and shuttled the broadcast quality VTRs exactly to the points necessary to record and edit master with exact edits from the source tapes.

Though recording to computer disc pack and this first attempt at non-linear editing on video was abandoned as too expensive, the rest of the hardware was recycled into the offline/online edit process that remained dominant in television production for the next 20 years or more.

Although tape formats changed from open reels to videocassettes (VCR), and all the equipment rapidly became much cheaper, the basics of the process remained the same. An editor would offline on a less expensive, low quality format, before entering the online editing suite with an EDL and master source tapes, to finish the broadcast quality version of the television show. Even after the transition to digital the concept is the same, with low resolution proxy files streaming from central media storage during editing and the full quality video only getting brought up from deep storage once the clip is committed and rendered.

== See also ==
- Direct to disk recording
- DTE (direct to edit)
- Non-destructive editing
- Tapeless camcorder
- Video server
