= Video editing =

Editing live television and video production

Video editing is the post-production and arrangement of video shots. Video editors draw from a variety of techniques from film cinematography, television, and other sorts of videography. Video editing structures and presents all video information, including films and television shows, video advertisements and video essays. Video editing has been dramatically democratized in recent years by editing software available for personal computers. Editing video can be difficult and tedious, so several technologies have been produced to aid people in this task. Overall, video editing has a wide variety of styles and applications.

== Types of editing ==
Though once the province of expensive machines called video editors, video editing software is now available for personal computers and workstations. Video editing includes cutting segments (trimming), re-sequencing clips, and adding transitions and other special effects.

- Linear video editing uses video tape and is edited sequentially. Several video clips from different tapes are recorded to one single tape in the order that they will appear.
- Non-linear editing systems (NLE) allow video(s) to be edited on computers with specialized software. This process is not destructive to the raw video footage and is done by using programs such as DaVinci Resolve, Avid Media Composer, Adobe Premiere Pro and Final Cut Pro.
- Offline editing is the process by which raw footage is copied from an original source, without affecting the original film stock or videotape. Once the editing is complete, the original media is then re-assembled in the online editing stage.
- Online editing is the process of reassembling the edit to a full-resolution video after an offline edit has been performed. It is done in the final stage of a video production.
- Cloud-based editing is the process of utilizing the internet to work with content remotely, collaboratively or of a time-critical nature such as editing of live sports events in real-time using video proxies (lower resolution copies) of original material.
- Vision mixing is used when working within live television and video production environments. A vision mixer is used to cut live feed coming from several cameras in real time.

== Background ==
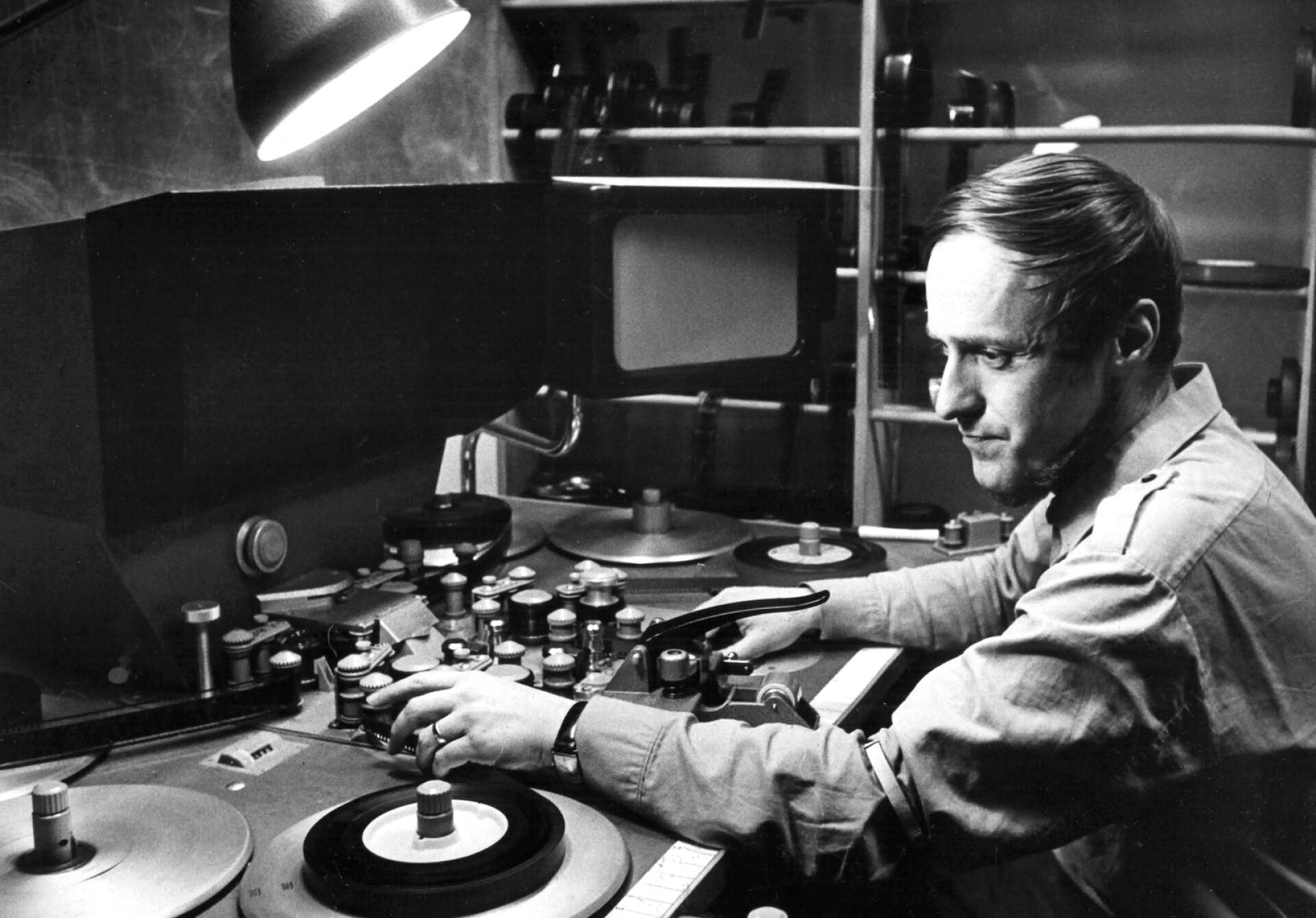
Video editing table

Video editing is one of the most crucial steps of the post-production process. The process combines all motion video production footage, special effects and sound recordings to create a compelling visual story. Before editing film, makers would require the camera to be stationary, with the action being distant from the camera. The video was captured with single shots strung together without regard for continuity, screen direction, lighting, emotional consideration, etc. Using video footage, a director can communicate non-fictional and fictional events. The goal of editing is to combine video and sound to communicate to the audience and allow them to feel emotionally connected to the story. It is a visual art.

Motion picture film editing is a predecessor to video editing and, in several ways, video editing simulates motion picture film editing. Video editing was first introduced with the use of linear video editing, which was performed before digital software. Followed by video editing software on non-linear editing systems (NLE).

=== Linear editing ===
The first type of editing in the early 1900s was made with scissors, tape, and an editing table. Since editors could not view their edits while in the process, holding the film to the light was their only way of viewing their work. The invention of the Moviola in the 1920s introduced a machine that enabled editors to view film footage while editing, allowing for greater precision. this process was used for about fifty years and helped advance video editing.

In the 1950s, video tape recorders (VTR) were invented and it was a defining element in the advancement of video editing. The VTR was the first device to use magnetic tape and was a revolutionary addition to video editing but had major drawbacks; the quality degradation caused by copying was so great, that a 2-inch Quadruplex videotape was edited by visualizing the recorded track with ferrofluid, cutting it with a razor blade or guillotine cutter, and splicing with video tape. The two pieces of tape to be joined were painted with a solution of extremely fine iron filings suspended in carbon tetrachloride, a toxic and carcinogenic compound. This "developed" the magnetic tracks (tape), making them visible when viewed through a microscope so that they could be aligned in a splicer designed for this task. The process allowed editors to play back their video but only at one speed and to mark the point of cut an editor had to be very precise. This process was used up until the late 1970s and early 1980s but the evolution of video editing continued. By the 1960s the EECO 900 was invented as well as the Ampex EDITEC which allowed for electronic editing and an electronic editing controller.

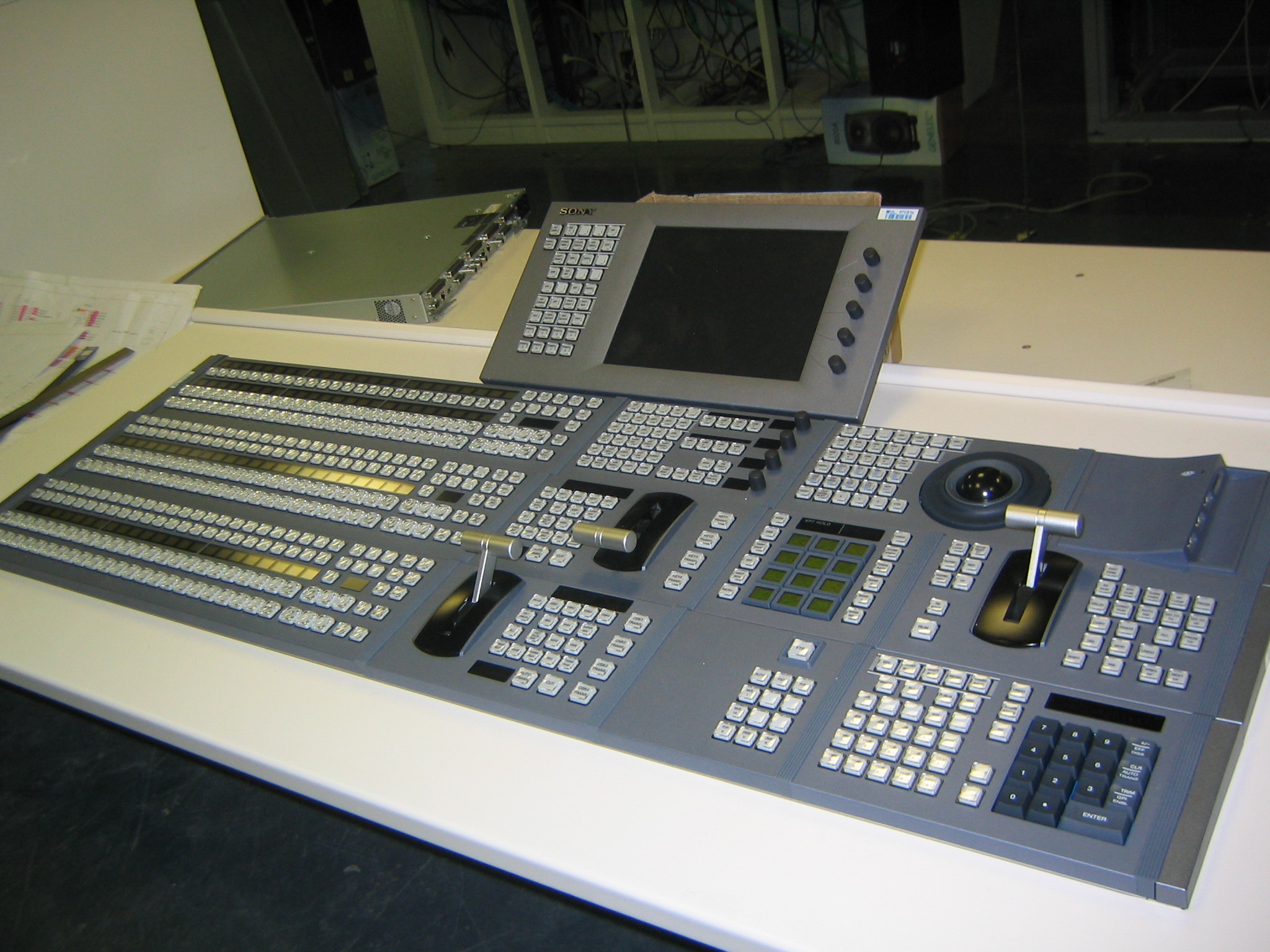
Vision mixer

Improvements in quality and economy, and the invention of the flying erase-head, allowed new video and audio material to be recorded over the material already present on an existing magnetic tape. This was introduced into the linear editing technique. If a scene closer to the beginning of the videotape needed to be changed in length, all later scenes would need to be recorded onto the videotape again in sequence. In addition, sources could be played back simultaneously through a vision mixer (video switcher) to create more complex transitions between scenes. A popular 1970–80s system for creating these transitions was the U-matic equipment (named for the U-shaped tape path). That system used two tape players and one tape recorder, and edits were done by automatically having the machines back up, then speed up together simultaneously, so that the edit didn't roll or glitch. Later, in the 1980-90's came the smaller beta equipment (named for the B-shaped tape path), and more complex controllers, some of which did the synchronizing electronically.

=== Non-linear editing ===
Non-linear editing (NLE) was first introduced in the 1970s with the CMX 600, which allowed editors to modify and edit the pieces of footage to be moved and placed in an alternate timeline, preserving the original footage, and the ability to work on any segment in the video in any order. In 1984, the invention of the Editdroid created by LucasFilm allowed editors a computerized editing system that stored large quantities of high-definition footage.

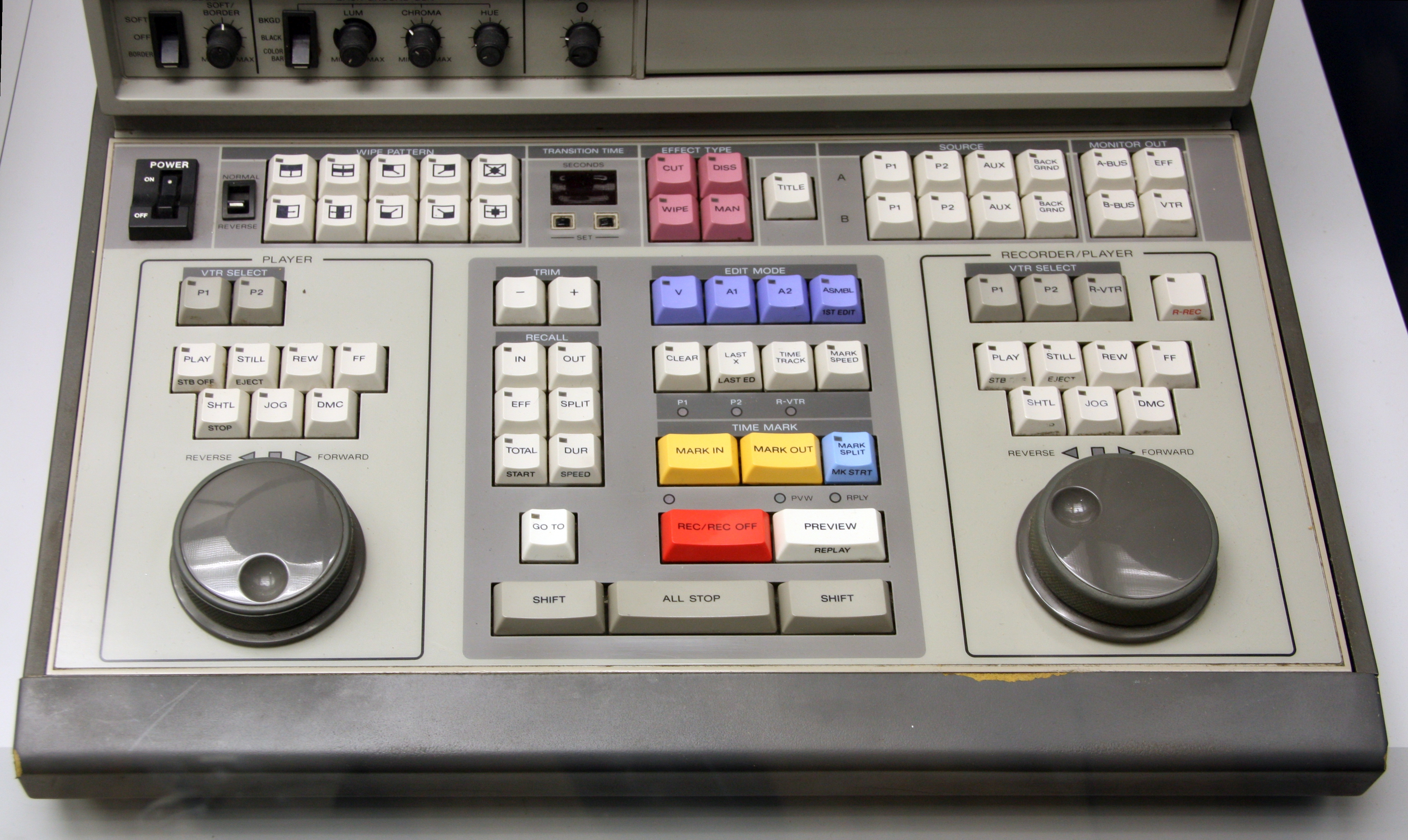
Video editing controller Sony BVE-600 for the analog U-matic system, 1980s

There was a transitional analog period using multiple source videocassette recorders (VCR) with the Montage Picture Processor and Ediflex, or EditDroid using LaserDisc players, but modern NLE systems edit video digitally captured onto a hard drive from an analog video or digital video source. Content is ingested and recorded natively with the appropriate codec that the video editing software uses to process captured footage. With high-definition video becoming more popular, it can be readily edited using the same video editing software along with related motion graphics programs. In the late 1980s and early 1990s, at-home NLE software became more apparent on home computers using software such as Avid Media Composer and Adobe Premiere. The video clips are arranged on a timeline; music tracks, titles, digital on-screen graphics are added, special effects can be created, and the finished program is "rendered" into a finished video. The video may then be distributed in a variety of ways including DVD, web streaming, QuickTime Movies, iPod, CD-ROM, or video tape.

By the 2000s, NLE had become accessible to everyone, with advanced of central processing units (CPUs) on personal computers giving the ability to edit at home with higher resolutions.

== Home video editing ==
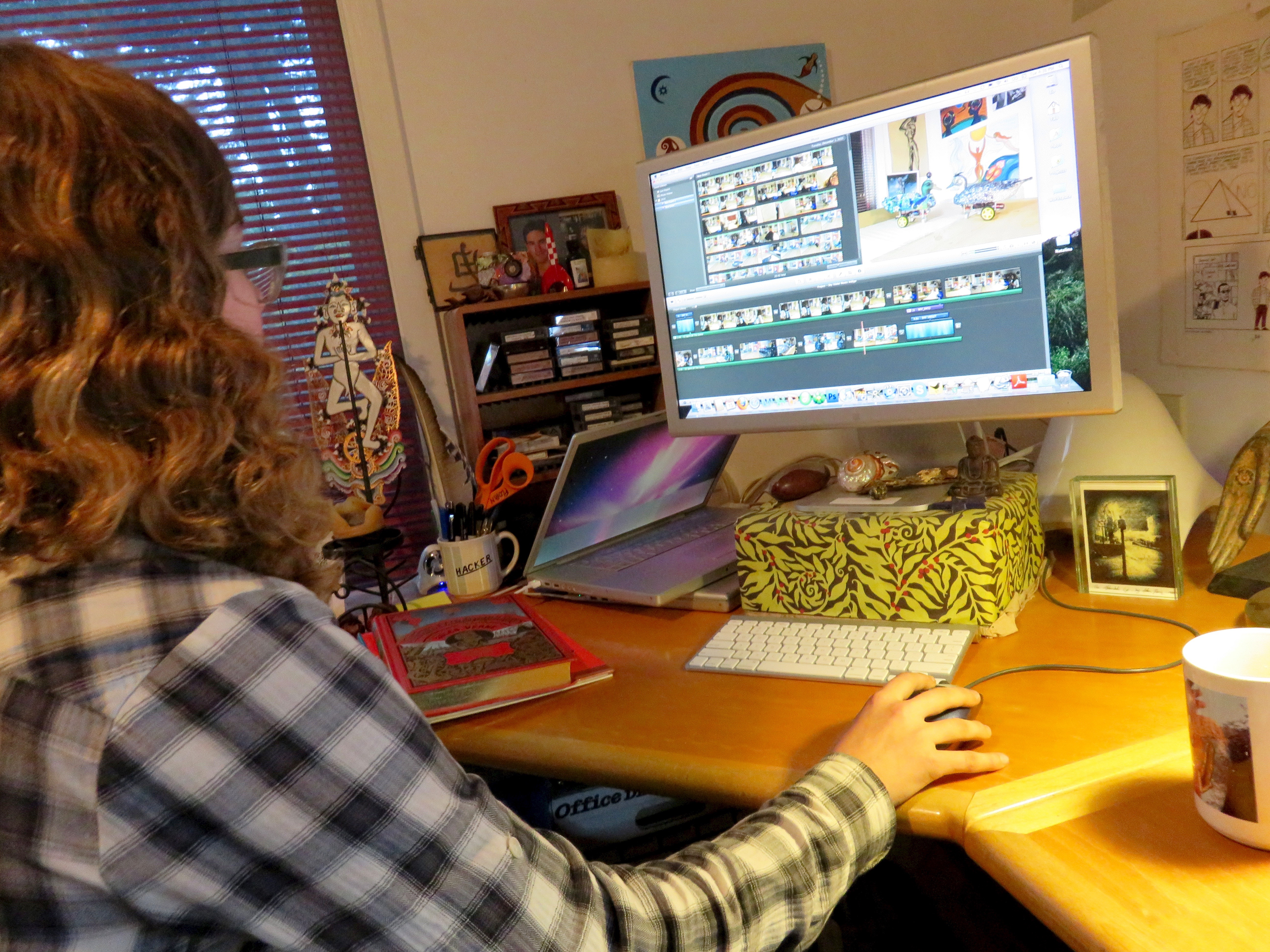
A woman editing a video using iMovie

Like some other technologies, the cost of video editing has declined over time. The original 2" Quadruplex system costs so much that many television production facilities could only afford a single unit, and editing was a highly involved process that required special training.

In contrast to this, nearly any home computer sold since the year 2000 has the speed and storage capacity to digitize and edit standard-definition television (SDTV). The two major retail operating systems include basic video editing software – Apple's iMovie and Microsoft's Windows Movie Maker. Additional options exist, usually as more advanced commercial products. As well as these commercial products, there are open-source video-editing programs. Automatic video editing products have also emerged, opening up video editing to a broader audience of amateurs and reducing the time it takes to edit videos. These usually exist as media storage services, such as Google with its Google Photos or smaller companies like Vidify.

== Video editor ==
A video editor is someone involved in video production and the post-production of filmmaking. Video editor's responsibilities involve decisions about the selection and combining of shots into sequences, as well as the addition of accompanying sound effects and music—to ultimately create a finished movie, television program, commercial, promo, or snippet. Video editors usually use non-linear editing software to accomplish the task of editing. A video editor is a technically inclined individual who makes creative video editing decisions.

A video editor can also refer to a computer device controller that controls video machines to mechanically put pieces of a film together using a 9-Pin Protocol. This is also referred to as machine-to-machine or linear.

A video editor is also used to refer to an application which can help users to combine different images or video parts and enhance their quality by applying effects and templates.

== Current applications ==
Video editing can be used for many purposes. Every social media app, workplace, YouTube video, and educational institute use this skill to create something visually appealing and informational.

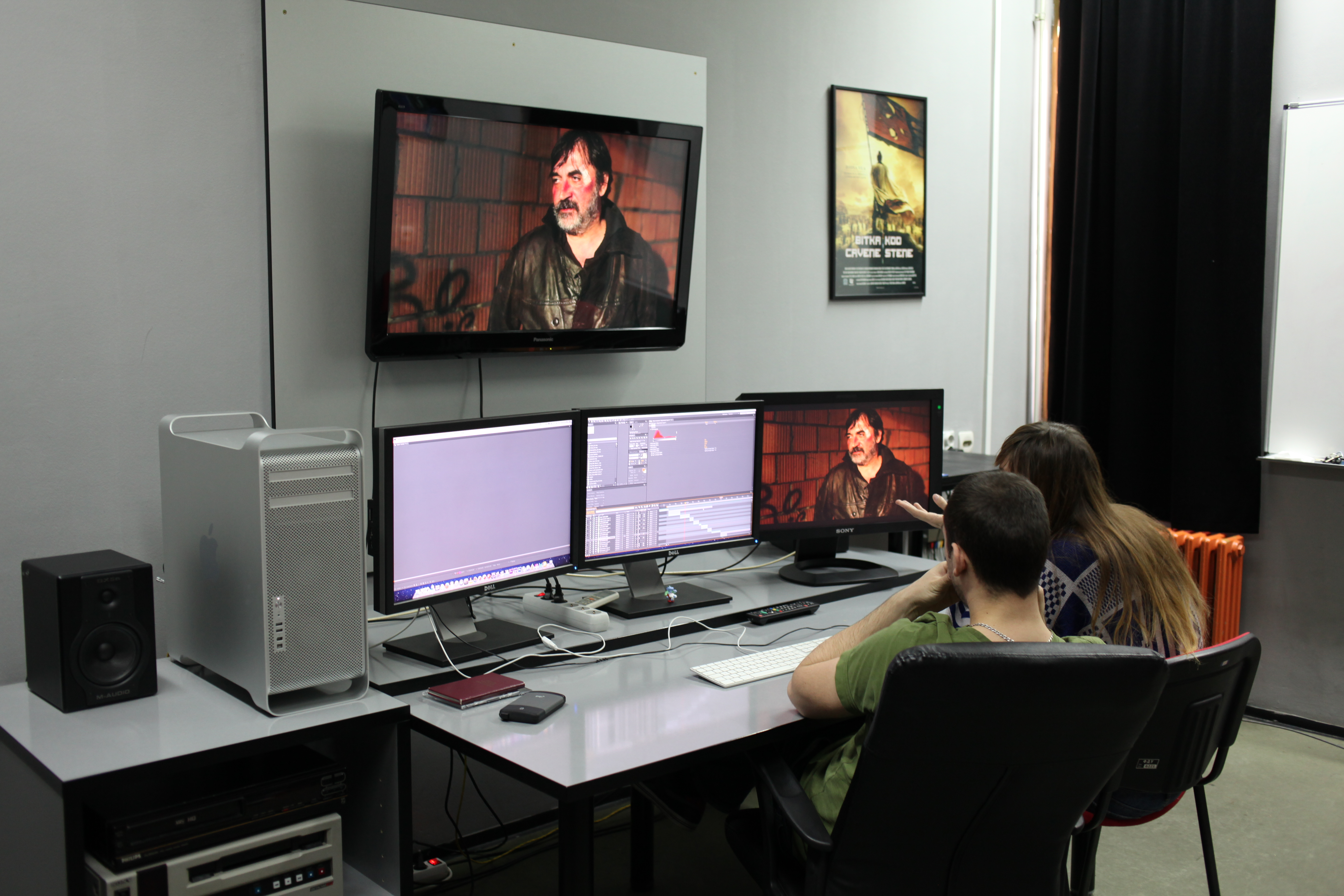
Collaborative video editing

- Personal use—Many programs online are easily obtainable to download from anyone's personal computer. Adobe, Canva, and Kdenlive are a couple examples of programs that are downloadable for anyone to use.
- Virtual reality—Advancements are being made to help with editing spherical video used in virtual reality settings. The ability to edit in virtual reality was created so that users would be able to check their video edits in real time, without having to continually view the video in a headset between edits.
- Social media— In commercial environments, video editing is widely used for digital marketing, brand storytelling, corporate communications, e-learning, product demonstrations, and short-form social media campaigns, particularly for platforms such as YouTube Shorts, Instagram Reels, and TikTok. School teachers have used video editing to help their students retain information and extend lessons outside the classroom.

== Future applications ==
Extracurricular courses in elementary schools throughout the United States have been started to educate students on the importance of video editing and practice video production. Notable themes of videos being taught in schools include music videos and short documentaries; some of which win awards such as one from Panasonic.

== See also ==
- Edit decision list
- Video mashups
- Photo slideshow software
- Video scratching
- Video manipulation
- Video server
- List of video editing software
- Comparison of video editing software
