= Linear video editing =

Type of video editing post-production process

Linear video editing is a video editing post-production process of selecting, arranging, and modifying images and sound in a predetermined, ordered sequence. Regardless of whether it was captured by a video camera, tapeless camcorder, or recorded in a television studio on a video tape recorder (VTR), the content must be accessed sequentially.

Video editing software has mostly replaced linear editing. Previously, film editing was done in a linear fashion, where film reels were literally cut into long strips divided by takes and scenes and then glued or taped back together to create a logical sequence of film. Linear video editing is more time-consuming, highly specialized, and tedious work. Still, it is relevant today because of these reasons:

- Linear video editing is simple and inexpensive.
- Mandatory for some jobs. For example, if only two sections of video clips are to be joined together in sequence, it is often the quickest and easiest way.
- Some video editors still learn linear editing skills, as it increases their knowledge as well as their versatility. According to many professional editors who learn linear editing skills first, they tend to become more proficient, all-around editors.

Until computer-based random-access non-linear editing systems (NLE) first appeared in the early 1990s, linear video editing was simply called video editing.

== History ==
Live television is still essentially produced in the same manner as it was in the 1950s, although it has been transformed by modern technical advances. Before video tape, the only way to air the same shows again was by filming shows using a kinescope, essentially a video monitor paired with a movie camera. However, kinescopes (the films of television shows) suffered from various sorts of picture degradation, from image distortion and apparent scan lines to artifacts in contrast and loss of detail. Kinescopes had to be processed and printed in a film laboratory, making them unreliable for broadcasts delayed for different time zones.

The primary motivation for the development of video tape was as a short- or long-term archival medium. Only after a series of technical advances spanning decades did video-tape editing finally become a viable production tool, up to par with film editing.

== Early technology ==
The first widely accepted video tape in the United States was two-inch quadruplex videotape, which traveled at 15 inches per second (38 cm/s). To gain enough head-to-tape speed, four video recording and playback heads were spun on a head wheel across most of the two-inch width of the tape. (Audio and synchronization tracks were recorded along the sides of the tape with stationary heads.) This system was known as "quad" (for "quadruplex") recording.

The resulting video tracks were slightly less than a ninety-degree angle (considering the vector addition of high-speed spinning heads tracing across the forward motion of the tape).

Originally, video was edited by visualizing the recorded track with ferrofluid, cutting it with a razor blade or guillotine cutter, and splicing with video tape, in a manner similar to film editing. This was an arduous process that should be avoided where possible. When it was used, the two pieces of tape to be joined were painted with a solution of extremely fine iron filings suspended in carbon tetrachloride, a toxic and carcinogenic compound. This "developed" the magnetic tracks, making them visible when viewed through a microscope, so that they could be aligned in a splicer designed for this task. The tracks had to be cut during a vertical retrace without disturbing the odd/even field ordering. The cut also had to be at the same angle that the video tracks were laid down on the tape. Since the video and audio read heads were several inches apart, it was not possible to make a physical edit that would function correctly in both video and audio. The cut was made for video, and a portion of the audio was then re-copied into the correct relationship, using the same technique as for editing 16 mm film with a combined magnetic audio track.

The disadvantages of physically editing tapes were many. Some broadcasters decreed that edited tapes could not be reused, in an era when the relatively high cost of the machines and tapes was balanced by the savings involved in being able to wipe and reuse the media. Others, such as the BBC, allowed reuse of spliced tape in certain circumstances as long as it conformed to strict criteria about the number of splices in a given duration, usually a maximum of five splices for every half hour. The process required great skill and often resulted in edits that would roll (lose sync), and each edit required several minutes to perform, although this was also initially true for the electronic editing that came later.

In the United States, the 1961–1962 Ernie Kovacs ABC specials and Rowan & Martin's Laugh-In were the only TV shows to make extensive use of splice editing of video tape.

== Introduction of computerized systems ==
A system for editing quad tape "by hand" was developed in the 1960s. It was really just a means of synchronizing the playback of two machines so that the signal of the new shot could be "punched in" with a reasonable chance at success. One problem with this and early computer-controlled systems was that the audio track was prone to suffer artifacts (i.e., a short buzzing sound) because the video of the newly recorded shot would record into the side of the audio track. A commercial solution known as "Buzz Off" was used to minimize this effect.

For more than a decade, computer-controlled quad editing systems were the standard post-production tool for television. Quad tape involved expensive hardware, time-consuming setup, relatively long rollback times for each edit and showed misalignment as disagreeable "banding" in the video. However, it should be mentioned that quad tape has a better bandwidth than any smaller-format analog tape, and properly handled, it could produce a picture indistinguishable from that of a live camera.

== Further advancement in technology ==
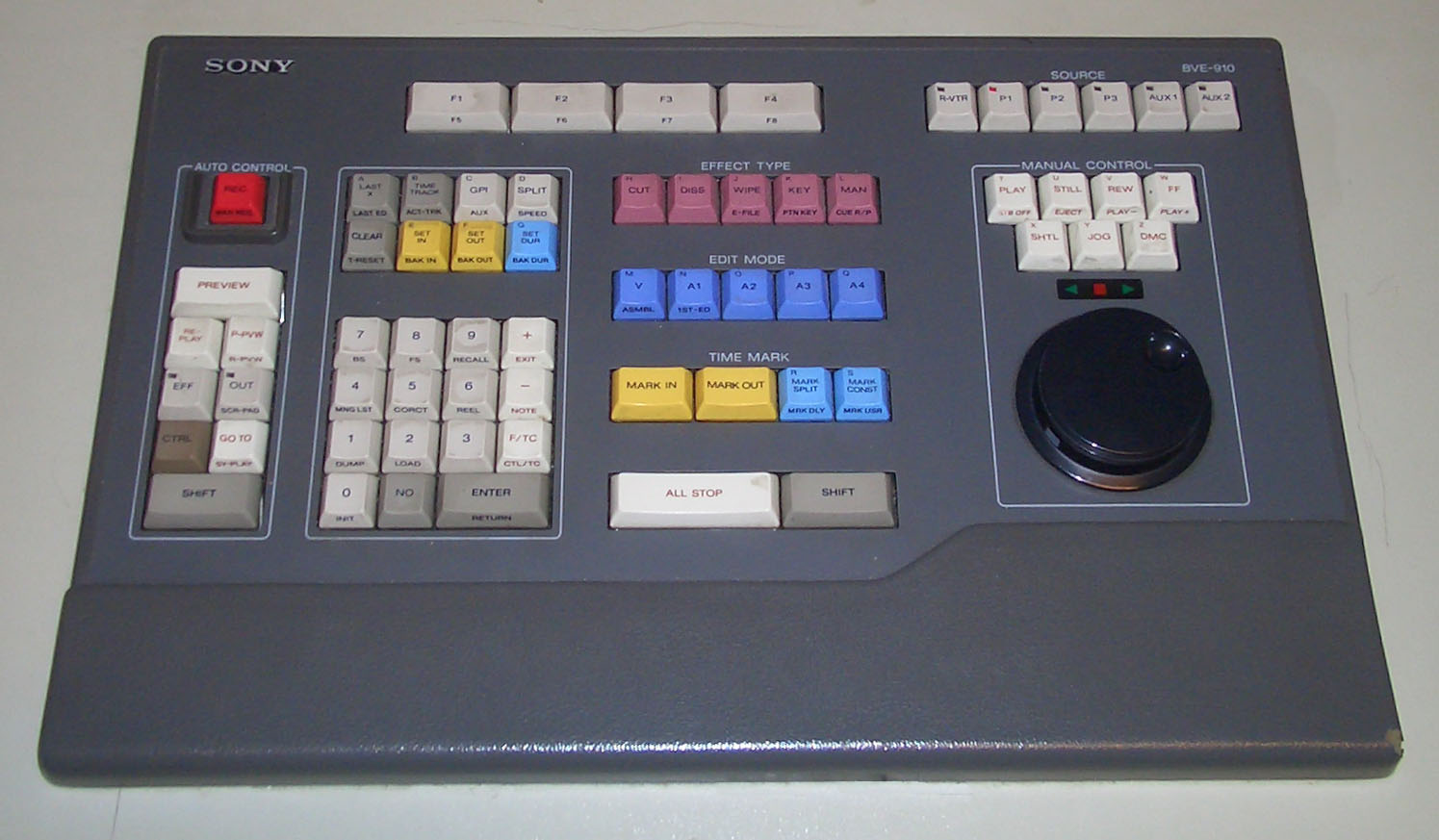
A Sony BVE-910 linear editing system's keyboard

When helical-scan video recorders became the standard, it was no longer possible to physically cut and splice the tape. At this point, video editing became a process of using two video tape machines, playing back the source tape (or "raw footage") from one machine, and copying just the portions desired onto a second tape (the "edit master").

The bulk of linear editing is done simply, with two machines and an edit controller device to control them. Many video tape machines are capable of controlling a second machine, eliminating the need for an external editing control device.

This process is "linear", rather than non-linear editing, as the nature of the tape-to-tape copying requires that all shots be laid out in the final edited order. Once a shot is on tape, nothing can be placed ahead of it without overwriting whatever is already there. (Such a replacement is sometimes called an "insert edit".) If absolutely necessary, material can be dubbed by copying the edited content onto another tape; however, as each copy generation degrades the image cumulatively, this is not desirable.

One drawback of early video editing techniques was that it was impractical to produce a rough cut for presentation to an executive producer. Since executive producers are never familiar enough with the material to be able to visualize the finished product from an inspection of an edit decision list (EDL), they were deprived of the opportunity to voice their opinions at a time when those opinions could be easily acted upon. Thus, particularly in documentary television, video was resisted for quite a long time.

== Peak usage ==
Video editing reached its full potential in the late 1970s, when computer-controlled minicomputer edit controllers, along with communications protocols were developed, which could orchestrate an edit based on an EDL, using timecode to synchronize multiple tape machines and auxiliary devices using a 9-Pin Protocol. The most popular and widely used computer editing systems came from Sony, Ampex and the venerable CMX. Systems such as these were expensive, especially when considering auxiliary equipment like VTR, video switchers and character generators (CG) and were usually limited to high-end post-production facilities.

Strassner Editing Systems

Jack Calaway of Calaway Engineering was the first to produce a lower-cost, PC-based, "CMX-style" linear editing system, which greatly expanded the use of linear editing systems throughout the post-production industry. Following suit, other companies, including EMC and Strassner Editing Systems, came out with equally useful competing editing products.

== Current usage ==
While computer-based non-linear video editing software has been adopted throughout most of the advertisement, film, industrial, and consumer video industries, linear video tape editing is still used where real-time workflows are more important, like live television or surveillance applications, where footage must be edited instantaneously without needing rendering or file transfers.

Linear video editing is still occasionally practiced in small facilities that still use legacy tape equipment, and linear video editing is still taught in educational programs to teach basic timing and sequential editing, all while still being used in projects dealing with archival footage and the restoration of tape-based media. News departments often still use linear editing because they can start editing tape and feeds from the field as soon as they are received, since no additional time is spent capturing material as is necessary in non-linear editing systems.

== See also ==
- Offline editing
