= Rough cut =

Stage in the film editing process

In filmmaking, the rough cut (also known as the first cut or editor's cut) is the second of three stages of offline editing. The term originates from the early days of filmmaking when film stock was physically cut and reassembled, but is still used to describe projects that are recorded and edited digitally.

The rough cut is the first stage in which the film begins to resemble its final product. Rough cuts are recognizable as a conventional film, but may have notable errors or defects, may not have the desired narrative flow from scene to scene, may lack soundtrack music, sound effects or visual effects, and still undergo many significant changes before the release of the film.

== Characteristics ==
At the rough cut stage, the selected shots have been moved from the order in which they were filmed into the approximate order in which they will appear in the final film, with approximate trimming. The sound is typically unfinished: dialogue and sound effects are often incomplete, and titles, graphics, special effects and composites are usually represented only by placeholders. Colour is generally untreated and unmatched between shots.

In modern big-budget films, work on the rough cut often begins while filming is still taking place. The editor assembles the first cut, the "editor's cut", arranging the separate takes into a coherent story in communication with the director. This version is often much longer than the final running time of the film.

== Place in the editing process ==
The rough cut is followed by further refinement of the edit, culminating in picture lock, after which online editing and audio mixing take place.

== Director's cut ==
A version said to be closer to the director's original creative vision is sometimes released as a director's cut.

== See also ==
- Picture lock
- Offline editing
- Film editing
- Director's cut
