= Edit decision list =

Used in the process of film editing and video editing

An edit decision list (EDL) is used in the post-production process of film editing and video editing. The list contains an ordered list of reel and timecode data representing where each video clip can be obtained in order to be able to conform the final cut.

EDLs are created by offline editing systems, or can be paper documents constructed by hand such as shot logging. These days, linear video editing systems have been superseded by non-linear editing (NLE) systems which can output EDLs electronically to allow autoconform on an online editing system – the recreation of an edited programme from the original sources (usually video tapes) and the editing decisions in the EDL.

Edit decision lists are also often used in the digital video editing world, so rather than referring to reels they can refer to sequences of images stored on disk.

Some formats, such as CMX3600, can represent simple editing decisions only. Final Cut Pro XML, the Advanced Authoring Format (AAF), and AviSynth scripts are relatively advanced file formats that can contain sophisticated EDLs.

== Simple EDL Format ==
A simple time EDL format used by MCEBuddy, MPlayer, XBMC, Kodi and other linear time software looks like:

[begin second] [end second] [action]

Where the seconds are floating-point numbers and the action is either 0 for cut, 1 for mute, 2 for scene marker and 3 for skip. For example, the following .edl file content will be cut from second 5.3 to second 7.1, mute at 15 seconds, unmute at 16.7 seconds, and commercial skip from 420 seconds to 822 seconds. There will be two scene markers. The first at 255.3 seconds and the next at 720.1 seconds.

5.3   7.1    0
15    16.7   1
420   822    3
1     255.3  2
720.1        2

A simple frame EDL format looks like:

#[begin frame] #[end frame] [action]

Where the frames are integer numbers and the action is either 0 for cut, 1 for mute, 2 for scene marker and 3 for skip.

The following .edl file content will cut from frame 127 to frame 170, mute at frame 360, unmute at frame 400, and commercial skip from frame 10080 to frame 19728. There will be two scene markers. The first at frame 6127 and the next at frame 17282.

#127   #170    0
#360   #400    1
#10080 #19728  3
#1     #6127   2
#17282         2

== B-Roll ==
Linear editing systems cannot dissolve between clips on the same video tape. Hence, one of these clips will need to be dubbed onto a new video tape. EDLs designate these occurrences by marking such dissolves' source reels as B-roll of "b-reels". For example, the EDL will change the 8th character of the reel name to the letter B.

However, sometimes editors will (confusingly) use the letter B to designate time code breaks on a video tape. If there is broken time code on a video tape, there will be two (or more) instances of a particular time code on the video tape. When re-capturing, it can be ambiguous as to which timecode is the right one. The letter B may indicate that the right time code is from the second set of timecode on the video tape.

== Incompatibilities and potential problems ==
EDL formats such as CMX, GVG, Sony, Final Cut Pro, and Avid are similar but can differ in small (but important) ways. Particular attention should be paid to reel naming convention. On the Avid, reel names can be up to 32 characters, but user should be aware that these EDLs don't adhere to online editing machine control specifications. These are used by systems that have modified the import/export code to handle file-based workflows as tape acquisition formats wane. On FCP, in CMX3600 format, only eight characters are allowed. Particular attention should be paid towards b-reels. If the EDL handles dissolves to the same reel, reel names should be limited to 7 characters since the 8th character may be replaced.

EDLs can use either drop-frame (DF) or non drop-frame timecode (NDF), running at 24fps (non drop-frame only), 25fps (non drop-frame only), and 30fps (drop-frame and non drop-frame).

Overall, EDLs are still commonly used as some systems do not support other more robust formats such as AAF and XML.

== Systems known to support EDL to some extent ==
Almost any professional editing system and many others support some form of XML/EDL saving/processing.

Some that make the list:

- Adobe Premiere Pro
- Avid Media Composer
- Blender supports EDL in versions 2.4x and versions from 2.66
- Cinelerra
- DaVinci Resolve
- Digital Vision Nucoda and Phoenix
- Final Cut Pro
- Lightworks
- MCEBuddy
- MediaCoder
- Shotcut
- The Foundry HIERO
- Thydrjs Dream II and Xynergi systems
- Vegas Pro

== Systems supporting EDL playback, not just EDL cutting ==
Probably most of the above, plus any professional editing system, plus

- Avidemux project files.
- Bs.player
- MPlayer (EDL specifies what to skip or mute; only one source file per EDL; see also http://linuxgazette.net/178/brownss.html)
- MPlayer2 (EDL specifies what to show from which file)
- mpv (EDL specifies what to show from which file; different from MPlayer and MPlayer2)
- MythTV cut list
- SageTV
- SMPlayer automatically loads and applies a matching EDL file to the current movie being played
- VLC media player with xspf files that specify start and end times, or with movie content editor
- Kodi/XBMC
- Zoom Player Max
- mrViewer with reels files, which are plain ASCII files.

== See also ==
- AES31
- Keykode (Film editing)
- Commercial skipping sometimes uses EDLs to track commercial blocks.
- Magisto
