= OpenBroadcaster =

Streaming software

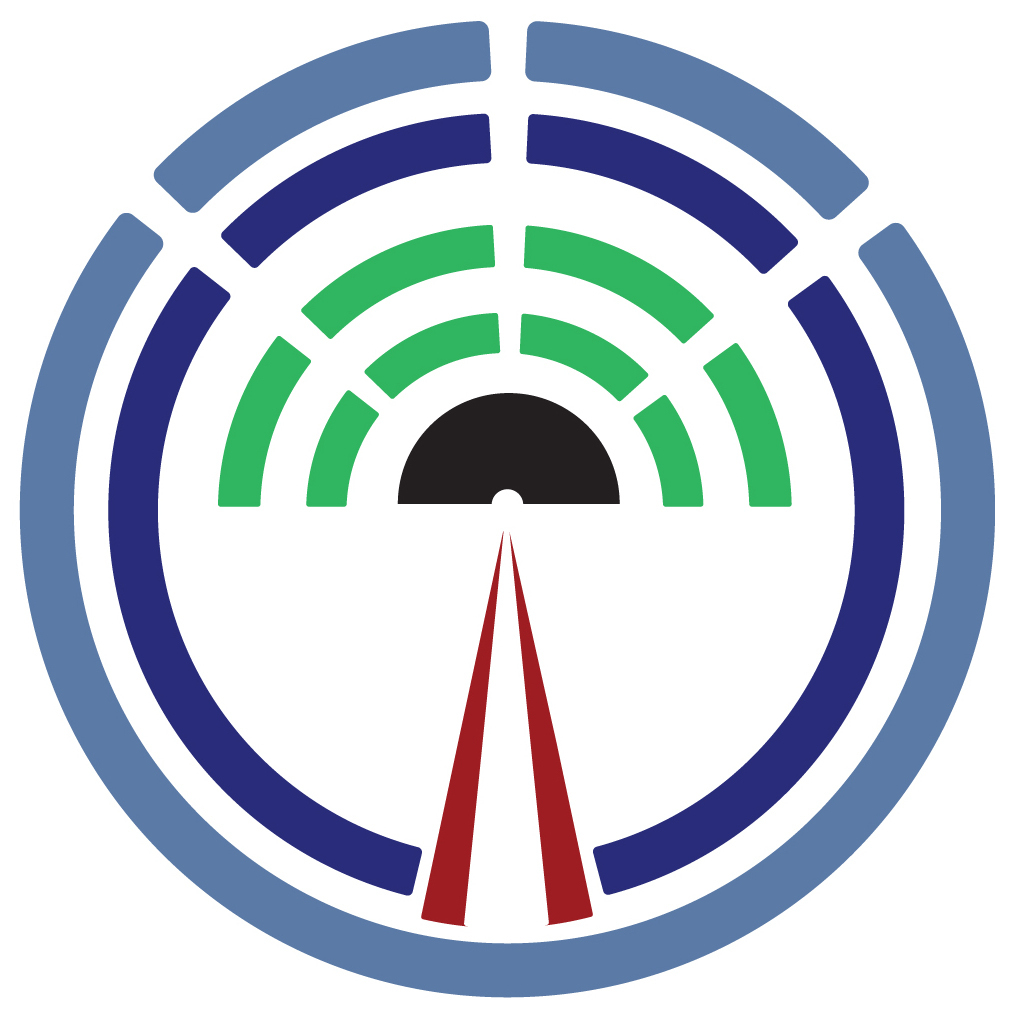

- OpenBroadcaster Dynamic Playlist
- Original author: Robert G. Hopkins
- Developer: OpenBroadcaster Community
- Initial release: 1 January 2003 (23 years ago)
- Stable release: 5.4.0 / 24 January 2026; 11 days ago
- Repository: github.com/openbroadcaster/observer
- Written in: JavaScript, jQuery, HTML5, Python, PHP,
- Operating system: Linux
- Platform: IA-32, x86-64, ARM
- Available in: 11 languages
- List of languages Spanish, English, Estonian, French, German, Thai, Chinese, Bangla, Hindi, Nepali, Portuguese
- Type: Radio Broadcast Automation Software Broadcast Automation Emergency Alert System Live Streaming
- License: AGPL-3.0-or-later
- Website: www.openbroadcaster.com

OpenBroadcaster is a web-based, open-source system to run community radio and television broadcast transmitters with a simple web interface.

== History ==
The initial concept was to develop a web based radio system to run emergency messages and public service announcements for export to Africa by using a windup radio designed by Trevor Baylis. . It was part of a Yukon College innovation project originating from Tagish Yukon Territory Canada.

On Labour Day weekend, 1997 CFET-FM 106.7FM was launched, for the benefit of communities in Tagish, Johnson's Crossing and Marsh Lake, YT. It was a one-man operation, but local volunteers could record material for sending to the station via the internet for broadcast. The system was used for the community's local emergency population warning for instantaneous relay of Yukon Forestry Service alerts for Wildfire situations. 2004 CFET-FM Radio began using OpenBroadcaster for User Generated Radio followed by CJUC-FM forming a Yukon network of radio stations. Similar models of indigenous community radio networks are supported nationally for language revitalization.

== Version history ==
Version	Features	Released
1.0	Shared Play lists, Scheduling, User assigned show templates and unattended emergency broadcasting.	2003-01-01
2.0	Multiple device, visual playback, support as a Joomla extension.	2008-01-01
3.0	AJAX, Python, jQuery, JSON on a Model–view–controller framework.	2009-01-01
4.0	Full blown API, HTML 5, Gstreamer, Festival tts, Modular programming environment to create plugins, skinnable UI themes. OBPlayer Xubuntu Gtk GUI and Headless software playout Streaming media application supports unattended priority emergency notification system.	2012-01-01
4.1	Common Alerting Protocol emergency broadcasting. Touch Screen LIVE Assist controller built on a HTML5 Mobile framework.	2015-07-01
5.0	Multicast RTP with Livewire and Ravenna_(networking) AoIP support. YouTube Live streaming to a Content delivery network.	2018-01-27

== Components ==
- OBServer: HTML5 AJAX web application for uploading content, creating smart playlists, managing users, assigning users to timeslots and for scheduling music. Decentralized file storage with centralized cloud computing management.
- OBPlayer: Linux application with GUI for logging and managing devices connected to transmitters, digital screens and supported devices accessible through a secure http(s) admin panel. Supports Audio over IP Ravenna (networking).
- Mobile: Cross platform application written in PhoneGap to allow users the ability to pitch electronic money to performers and artists in real time.

== Practical Uses ==
=== Audio ===
Source client for Icecast Shoutcast streaming media server, LPFM and under regulated radio, Smart music scheduling system to microbroadcast theme based music segments for restaurants and public spaces, Tourism Radio with Audio tour GPS coded triggering for multicultural visitor experience, tourist information and highway advisory radio, User Determined Music Discovery Service, Dynamic Podcast assembler, Logging and archiving, Community radio Campus radio and High school radio networking, Special interest multicultural media in Canada broadcasters, syndicated in store advertising and public address distribution, Music on hold for telephone systems, Computer DJ Crowdcasting Community Jukebox, source for interplanetary Active SETI, RDS and Datacasting to remotely control Addressability devices with Crisis mapping, Song Requester 100% user-controlled radio.

=== Video ===
Low power Community television, under regulated TV service, User generated Community channel (Canada) on Cable TV, User Generated Adult Entertainment Channel Digital signage and visitor information, Analogue and Digital source material distribution and archiving for display in museums, Video on demand with podcasting utilizing digital rights management, Out-of-home advertising via shopping mall directories and digital menu boards with point-of-purchase promotions.

== See also ==
- Broadcast automation
- Radio software
- Community radio
- Linux Radio Broadcasting Software
- List of music software
