= Radio software =

Almost all radio stations today use some form of broadcast automation. Although some only use small scripts in audio players, a more robust solution is using a full radio automation suite. There are many commercial and free radio automation packages available.

== Radio software history ==
Radio software allows AM and FM broadcasting to reproduce music and voices from the computer's hard disk instead of using CD, MD, tape recorders or the old cartridge tape (see Fidelipac). Usually the radio stations stores all advertising campaigns and most of the music in hard disk. Then, instant replay of all the recorded material is done from a keyboard or with a click of the mouse. Now the PC is part of every AM and FM broadcasting, webcasting or podcasting system around the world.

Radio software not only reproduces audio. It is possible to create a “playlist” that can reproduce automatically, without a board operator, a complete radio program, including meteorological announces, advertising campaigns, music tunes, satellite network connection, etc. Then, 24 hours radio stations are possible, also in small towns that can not afford to have operators and speakers all around the clock. Standard PCs are connected in a LAN network to be used on the master control, production, news, administration, etc.

This technology is claimed to be invented in Buenos Aires by Oscar Bonello in 1989. The first radio software for automation, using lossy compressed digital audio codecs, was named Audicom and was internationally introduced at the 1990 National Association of Broadcasters Convention in Atlanta, USA. The world's first radio station to use it was one in San Francisco, California. The basis of the Audicom was the first application, targeted at radio automation, of the audio bit compression technology used to reduce the amount of data. Bonello delivered the first radio automation working technology using the masking curves published by Richard Ehmer.

See also earlier developments of a music scheduling system such as of the US company Radio Computing Services in 1979.

Nowadays with invention of the MP3 bit compression technology and standard audio cards there are a lot of automation software providers at the market. Some systems includes administration facilities for the traffic department, disc jockey schedule, live assist windows and even artificial intelligence automation control.

== Main components ==
=== Media database ===
The basic thing that a radio station does is to broadcast audio to its listeners. Audio can range from a simple talk over, a song or jingle to a sophisticated program with authored content. For profit radio stations rely on advertisements, or commercials, to generate revenue and sustain their operations.

The media database stores details on media files, typically mp3 encoded files. Attributes contain, but not limited to, file name, name of the song or audio file, type of media, its duration, etc...

Media records can have different types:

- Song
- Commercial
- Jingle
- Promotion
- Recorded program

=== Media editing ===
Media files can be edited prior to playback or broadcast. Typical audio editing features exist in most radio software solutions. In addition, radio software allows users to provide metadata for audio files, such as intro and outro positions within the file.

Some radio software contain multi-track editors that allows users to set the mix between two songs as well as audio volume levels.

=== Scheduling ===
Radio scheduling starts with a grid. A grid will contain one or more schedules. Grids span a long time period, usually no less than three months. Schedules will in turn contain a list of programs. Schedules span a short time period, typically one day. Programs are usually one to four hours in duration, typically one hour. Programs will contain a list of program elements. This list of program elements become the play list that radio software loads and automates.

Scheduling songs, external audio, or live shows, differs to scheduling commercials. The scheduler is used for defining program schedules but not to schedule commercials. There is a special module for commercial scheduling.

=== Commercials ===
The commercials module in radio software allows users to link commercials to campaigns and set their schedules for playback at future pre-defined times.

The more advanced radio software solutions allow users to schedule commercials in bulk or through integration.

=== Media playback ===
Is the component of a radio software that allows user to playback media files in full automation or manually on demand. These modules typically contain audio players, a visual representation of the currently playing audio file, a queue of songs to be played in sequence, timers and clocks displays, as well as a browser for audio files in the media database with search capabilities.

=== News ===
News modules are used to create news sessions and news articles which can be read by news readers on air. These modules allow users to attach audio files to the news article to playback during a live news session.

=== Broadcast recorder ===
Records audio 24/7 in compressed format, splits, names, and archives files according to a user-defined structure. Radio stations usually maintain at least three years worth of 24/7 recorded broadcast.

=== Broadcast streaming ===
This module of radio software allows users to publish an audio stream of the playback to a pre-defined streaming server.

=== Reports ===
Reports provide users with capabilities to analyze and summarize events generated by users or the radio software itself.

== See also ==
- List of amateur radio software
- List of free software for audio
- List of music software
