= CJUC-FM =

Radio station in Whitehorse, Yukon, Canada

Coordinates: 60°45′00″N 135°05′39″W

- Chambers House in Whitehorse
- Whitehorse, Yukon; Canada
- Frequency: 92.5 MHz
- Branding: "The Juice"

Programming
- Format: Community Radio

Ownership
- Owner: Utilities Consumers' Group

History
- First air date: 2003
- Call sign meaning: Utilities Consumers

Technical information
- ERP: 50 watts
- HAAT: 19.3 metres (63 ft)

Links
- Website: cjucfm.com

CJUC-FM is a Canadian community radio station that broadcasts at 92.5 FM at 50 watts in Whitehorse, Yukon.

Its license is held by a local nonprofit The Utilities Consumers' Group, a local organization that monitors utility providers and advocates for local residents in matters involving local utility services.

The station is run by dedicated community volunteers.

CJUC provides training opportunities for radio enthusiasts and members of the Whitehorse community.

CJUC uses OpenBroadcaster for broadcast automation.

== History ==
The station received approval on February 20, 2003. The Canadian Radio-television and Telecommunications Commission (CRTC) approved changes to the authorized contours of the transmitter for the station in 2014. On October 8, 2008, the CRTC approved an application to change the authorized contours of the transmitter for the low power English-language Type B community FM radio programming undertaking CJUC-FM Whitehorse.

On September 15, 2020, the CRTC denied an application by Utilities Consumers’ Group Society for a broadcasting licence to operate an English-language community FM radio station at 92.5 MHz with 50 watts in Whitehorse, Yukon.
