= Radio Computing Services =

Radio software and services provider

RCS Sound Software
- Type: Private
- Industry: Broadcast automation
- Founded: 1979; 47 years ago
- Founder: Dr. Andrew Economos
- Headquarters: White Plains, New York, United States
- Area served: Worldwide
- Key people: Philippe Generali, Chip Jellison, Mike Powell, Neal Perchuk, Sven Andrae, Robin Prior, Keith Williams, Chris Bean, Heather Dwyer, Barry Hill
- Products: Zetta, GSelector, Aquira, RCSNews, RCS2GO, Revma, Zetta Cloud
- Parent: iHeartMedia
- Website: www.rcsworks.com

RCS, originally Radio Computing Services, is a provider of scheduling and broadcast software for radio, Internet and television stations.

== History ==
RCS was founded in 1979 by Dr. Andrew Economos. The idea for RCS and its first product, Selector, came to him when he was in charge of computing activity at NBC. Economos saw a need for a way to automate the music scheduling process at company-owned stations, and replace the existing paper-based system, and he proposed the development of music scheduling software.

NBC executives deemed the project not important enough for the network to commit resources to. Economos left NBC after 15 years to develop the product on his own. Initial marketing of Selector was difficult due to the high cost of personal computers, and some resistance from stations who wanted to keep their paper-based scheduling systems. Sales of Selector gradually improved, and by 2006, the product had around 6,000 client stations in 100 countries.

On January 26, 2006, Clear Channel Communications (now iHeartMedia) purchased RCS as a subsidiary company. Clear Channel had acquired automation software company Prophet Systems in 1997. In January 2007, Clear Channel announced that the two companies would be merged. In September 2018, at the NextRadio conference in London, RCS president Philippe Generali announced that GSelector and Zetta would be available as cloud services.

== Family of companies ==
As RCS has grown, the company has made several acquisitions.

- Air Check: real-time analysis of songs and commercials
- Florical Systems: television automation and integrated playout
- Hit Predictor: listeners rate popular songs (ended in 2023)
- Mediabase: monitored airplay information
- Media Monitors: local media monitoring
- Test All Media: digital media research platform
- RCS2GO: mobile
- Revma: streaming solutions

== Software products ==
RCS has a range of products for different purposes.

=== Current ===
- Zetta, playout software.
- Gselector, scheduling software.
- Aquira, commercial booking and accounting software.
- RCS News, news reading software.

=== Former ===
- MasterControl, playout software replaced by NexGen.
- NexGen, playout software replaced by Zetta.
- Selector, scheduling software replaced by Gselector.

== Local offices ==
RCS operates in 23 offices positioned across the globe.

=== Americas ===
- United States of America (global headquarters)
- Canada
- Latin America

=== Europe ===
- France
- United Kingdom and Ireland
- Germany
- Scandinavia
- Poland
- Italy
- Türkiye
- Czech Republic/Slovakia

=== Asia-Pacific Region ===
- Australia
- New Zealand
- Singapore
- Thailand
- Indonesia
- Taiwan
- South Korea
- India
- China
- Malaysia

=== Africa ===
- Africa

=== Middle East ===
- Middle East and North Africa
