= Direct to edit =

Digital video direct-to-disk recording method

Direct to edit (DTE) is a digital video direct-to-disk recording method (and also refers to the associated equipment) used to streamline the post-production video editing workflow of raw video files into a non-linear editing system (NLE). Recent developments have added solid-state memory recording units with removable modules or flash-cards, to avoid potential hard-drive problems.

== See also ==
- Computer file
- Data storage device
- Digital video recorder (DVR)
- Flash memory
- Hard disk drive (HDD)
- Non-linear editing system (NLE)
- Professional video camera
- Tapeless camcorder
- Video editing software
- Video server
