= 9-Pin Protocol =

Communication protocol

The Sony 9-Pin Protocol or P1 protocol is a two-way communications protocol to control video recorders from the beginning of the 1980s onwards. Sony introduced this protocol to control reel-to-reel type C video tape recorders (VTR) as well as videocassette recorders (VCR). It uses an DE-9 D-Sub connector with 9 pins (hence the name), where bi-directional communication takes place over a four wire cable according to the RS-422 standard. The used pinout has become a de facto standard, used by most brands in the broadcast industry.

While nowadays all post-production editing is done with a non-linear editing system, in those days editing was done linearly, using online editing. Editing machines relied heavily on the 9-Pin Protocol to remotely control automatic players and recorders.

Other protocols appeared that were based on Sony's protocol, such as the Video Disk Control Protocol (VDCP) used for broadcast automation to playout broadcast programming schedules.

From the 2000s onwards, RS-422 was slowly phased out in favor of Ethernet for control functions. However its simple way to perform troubleshooting has delayed its retirement for a long time. Even as of 2025, many modern hard disk recorders and solid-state drive recorders can still emulate a 1982 Sony BVW-75 Betacam tape recorder. In many cases the devices only support the communications protocol, transported over Ethernet, but in some cases a 9-pin RS-422 port is also present.

The pinout on the DE-9 D-Sub connector is as follows:

Pin	on master	on slave
1	Frame ground	Frame ground
2	Receive A	Transmit A
3	Transmit B	Receive B
4	Transmit common	Receive common
5	Spare or ground	Spare or ground
6	Receive common	Transmit common
7	Receive B	Transmit B
8	Transmit A	Receive A
9	Frame ground	Frame ground
