= Closed-circuit television camera =

Type of surveillance camera

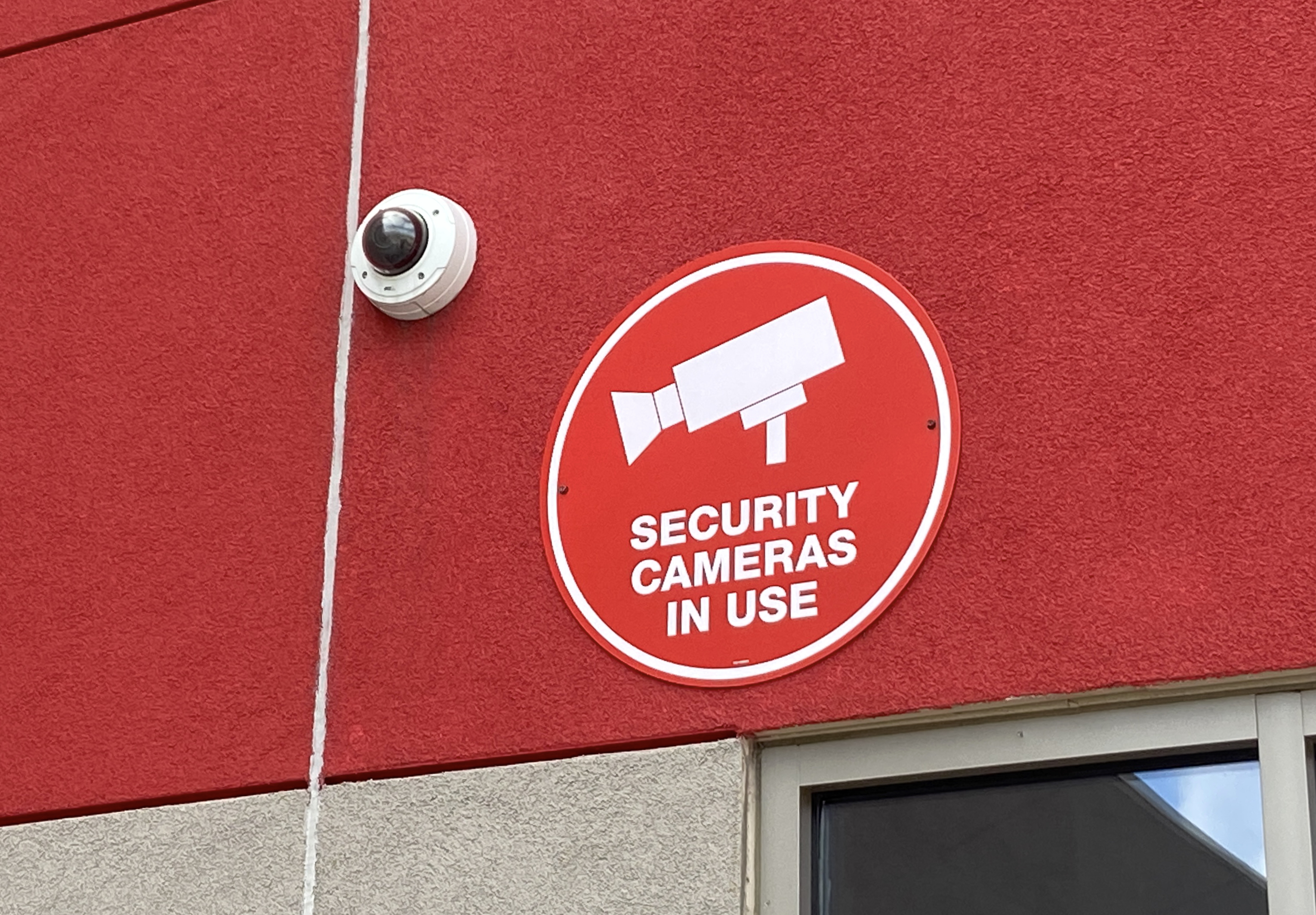
Vandal dome-style camera.

A closed-circuit television camera (CCTV camera) is a type of surveillance camera that transmits video signals to a specific set of video recording devices, rather than broadcasting the video over public airwaves. The term "closed-circuit television" indicates that the video feed is only accessible to a limited number of people or devices with authorized access. Cameras can be either analog or digital. Walter Bruch was the inventor of the CCTV camera.

== Video cameras ==
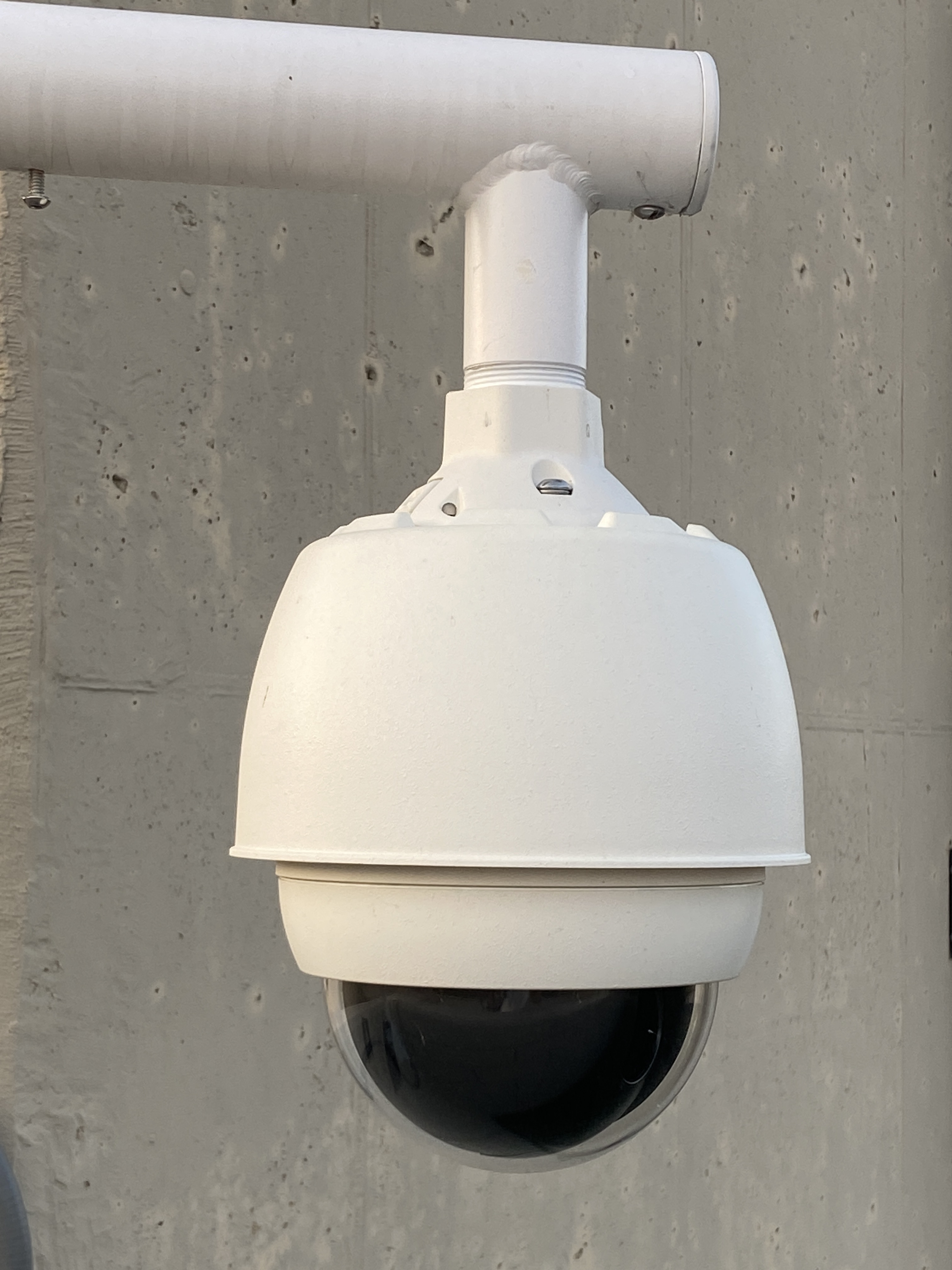
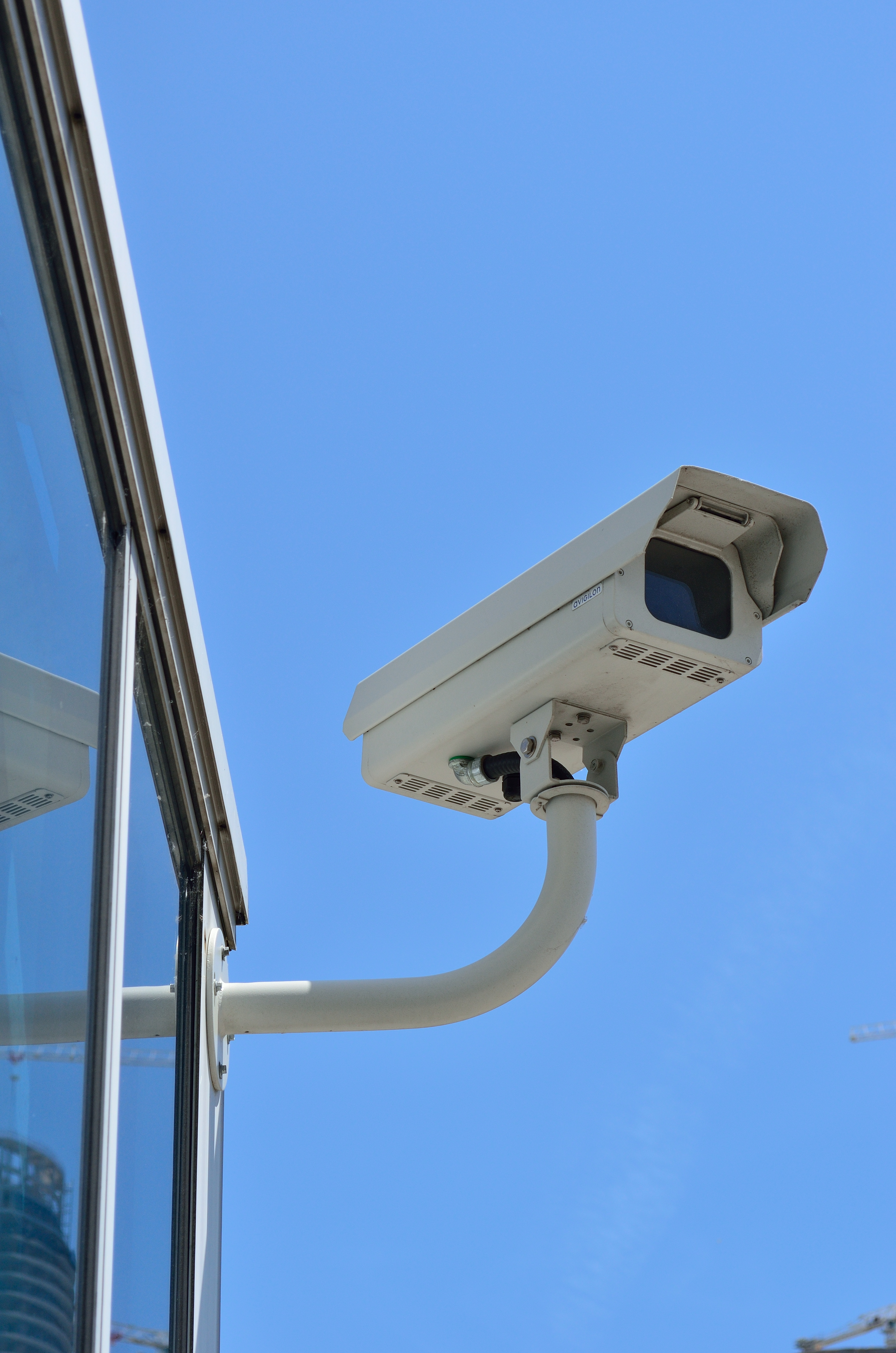
Three common types of cameras:
1. Pan-Tilt-Zoom (PTZ); 2. Vandal Dome; 3. Bullet

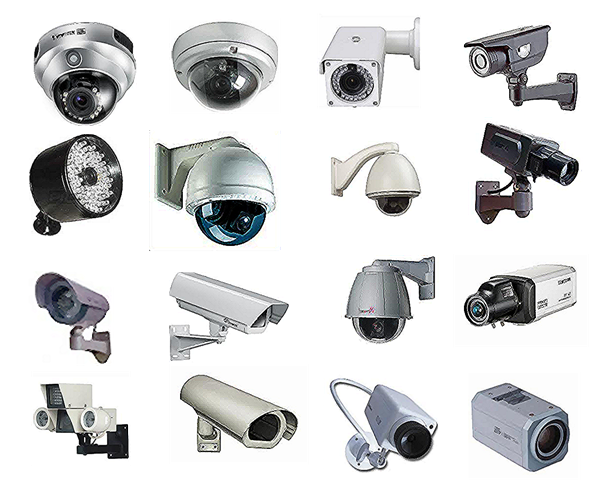
Different types of CCTV cameras.

Video cameras are either analogue or digital, which means that they work on the basis of sending analogue or digital signals to a storage device such as a video tape recorder or desktop computer or laptop computer.

=== Analogue ===
These cameras can record straight to a video tape recorder which can record analogue signals as pictures. If the analogue signals are recorded to tape, then the tape must run at a very slow speed in order to operate continuously. This is because to allow a three-hour tape to run for 24 hours, it must be set to run on a slow time-lapse basis, usually about four frames per second. In one second, the camera scene can change dramatically. A person for example can have walked a distance of 1 meter, and therefore if the distance is divided into four parts, i.e. four frames or "snapshots" in time, then each frame invariably looks like a blur, unless the subject keeps relatively still.

Analogue signals can also be converted into a digital signal to enable the recordings to be stored on a PC as digital recordings. In that case, the analogue video camera must be plugged directly into a video capture card in the computer, and the card then converts the analogue signal to digital. These cards are relatively cheap, but inevitably the resulting digital signals are compressed 5:1 (MPEG compression) for the video recordings to be saved on a continuous basis.

Another way to store recordings on a non-analogue media is through the use of a digital video recorder (DVR). Such a device is similar in functionality to a PC with a capture card and appropriate video recording software. Unlike PCs, most DVRs designed for CCTV purposes are embedded devices that require less maintenance and simpler setup than a PC-based solution, for a medium to a large number of analogue cameras.

Some DVRs also allow digital broadcasting of the video signal, thus acting like a network camera. If a device does allow broadcasting of the video, but does not record it, then it is called a video server. These devices effectively turn any analogue camera (or any analogue video signal) into a network TV.

=== Digital ===
These cameras do not require a video capture card because they work using a digital signal which can be saved directly to a computer. The signal is compressed 5:1, but DVD quality can be achieved with more compression (MPEG-2 is standard for DVD-video, and has a higher compression ratio than 5:1, with a slightly lower video quality than 5:1 at best, and is adjustable for the amount of space to be taken up versus the quality of picture needed or desired). The highest picture quality of DVD is only slightly lower than the quality of basic 5:1-compression DV.

Saving uncompressed digital recordings takes up an enormous amount of hard drive space, and a few hours of uncompressed video could quickly fill up a hard drive. Uncompressed recordings may look fine but one could not run uncompressed quality recordings on a continuous basis. Motion detection is therefore sometimes used as a workaround solution to record in uncompressed quality.

However, in any situation where standard-definition video cameras are used, the quality is going to be poor because the maximum pixel resolution of the image chips in most of these devices is 320,000 pixels (analogue quality is measured in TV lines but the results are the same); they generally capture horizontal and vertical fields of lines and blend them together to make a single frame; the maximum frame rate is normally 30 frames per second.

Multi-megapixel IP-CCTV cameras can capture video images at resolutions of several megapixels. Unlike with analogue cameras, details such as number plates are easily readable. At 11 megapixels, forensic quality images are made where each hand on a person can be distinguished. Because of the much higher resolutions available with these types of cameras, they can be set up to cover a wide area where normally several analogue cameras would have been needed.

=== Network ===
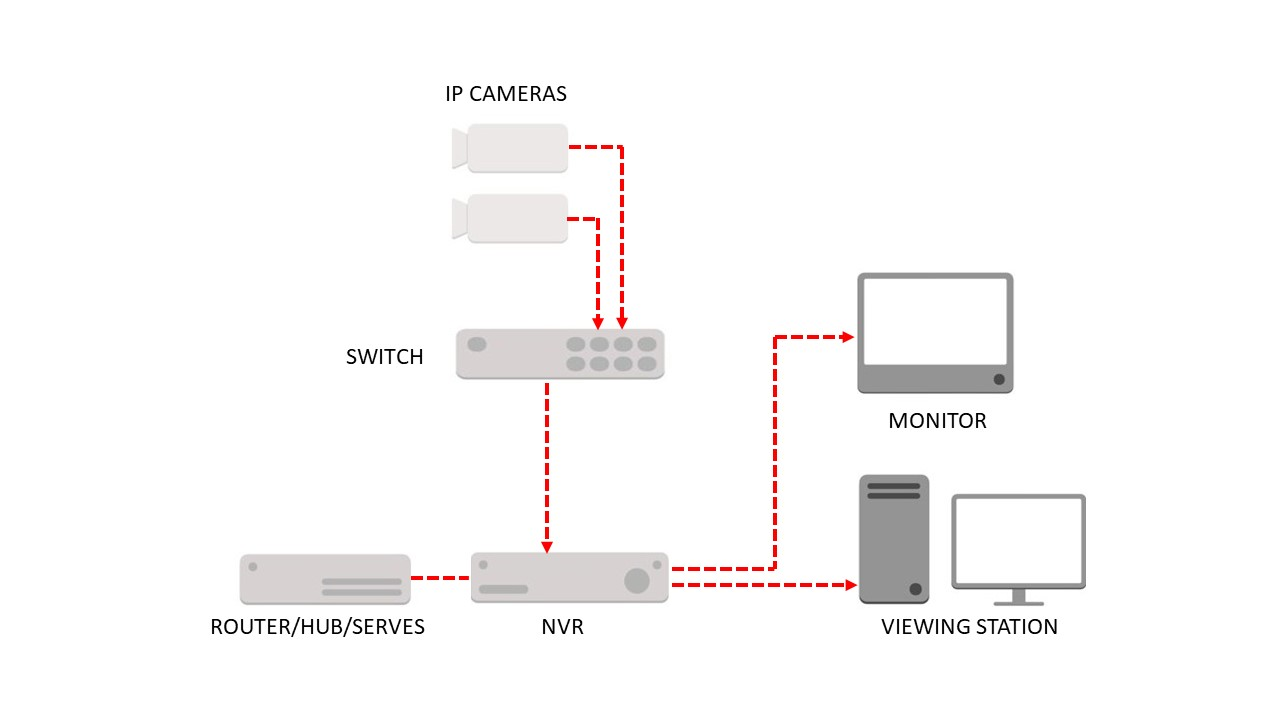
NVR system with IP cameras

IP cameras or network cameras are digital video cameras, plus an embedded video server having an IP address, capable of streaming the video (and sometimes, even audio).

Because network cameras are embedded devices, and do not need to output an analogue signal, resolutions higher than closed-circuit television 'CCTV' analogue cameras are possible. A typical analogue CCTV camera has a PAL (768x576 pixels) or NTSC (720x480 pixels), whereas network cameras may have VGA (640x480 pixels), SVGA (800x600 pixels) or quad-VGA (1280x960 pixels, also referred to as "megapixel") resolutions.

An analogue or digital camera connected to a video server acts as a network camera, but the image size is restricted to that of the video standard of the camera. However, optics (lenses and image sensors), not video resolution, are the components that determine the image quality.

Network cameras can be used for very cheap surveillance solutions (requiring one network camera, some Ethernet cabling, and one PC), or to replace entire CCTV installations (cameras become network cameras, tape recorders become DVRs, and CCTV monitors become computers with TFT screens and specialised software. Digital video manufacturers claim that turning CCTV installations into digital video installations is inherently better).

== Gallery of security cameras in use at landmarks ==
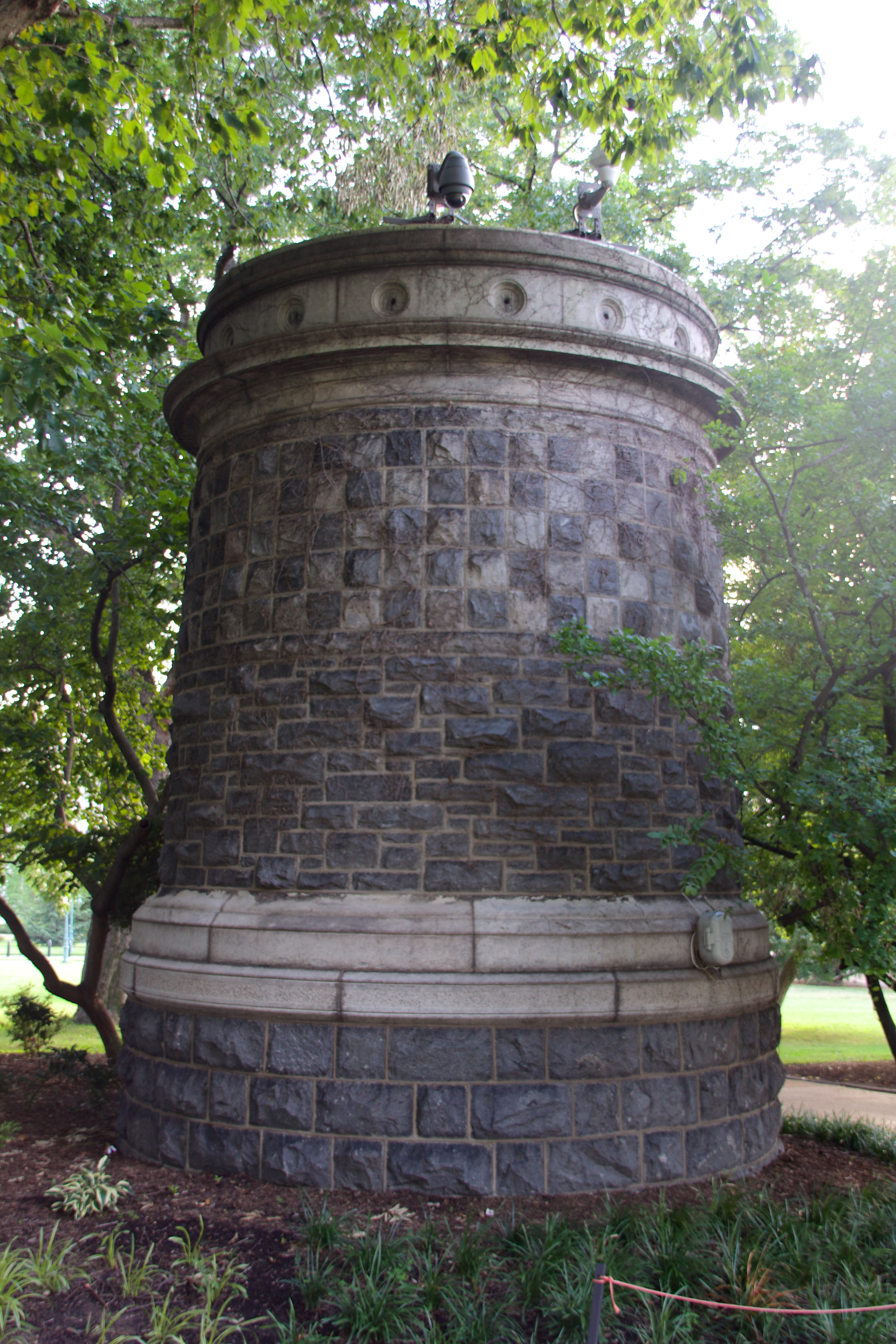
PTZ camera, United States Capitol, Washington, D.C.

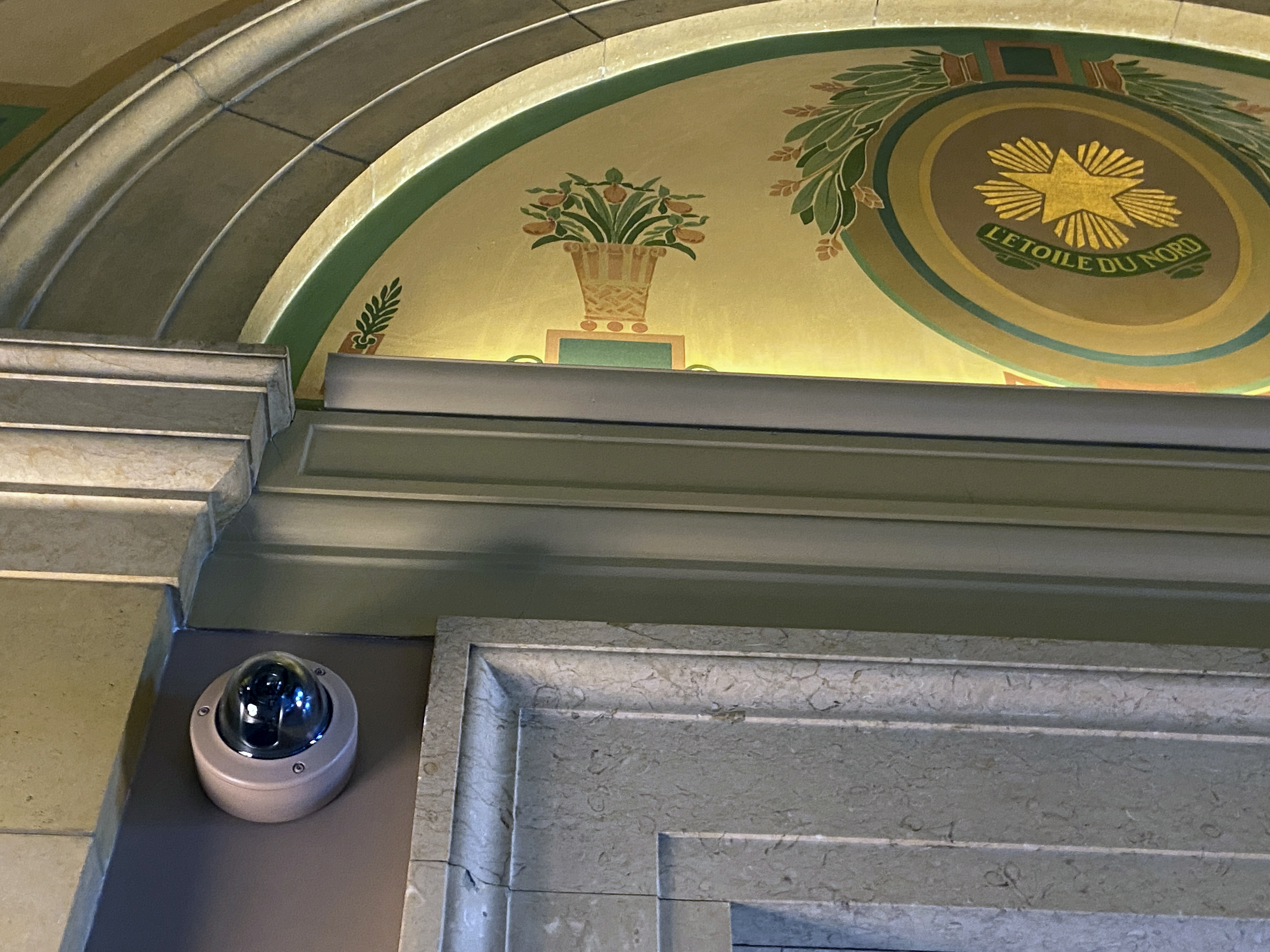
Vandal dome style camera, MN State Capitol, St. Paul, Minnesota

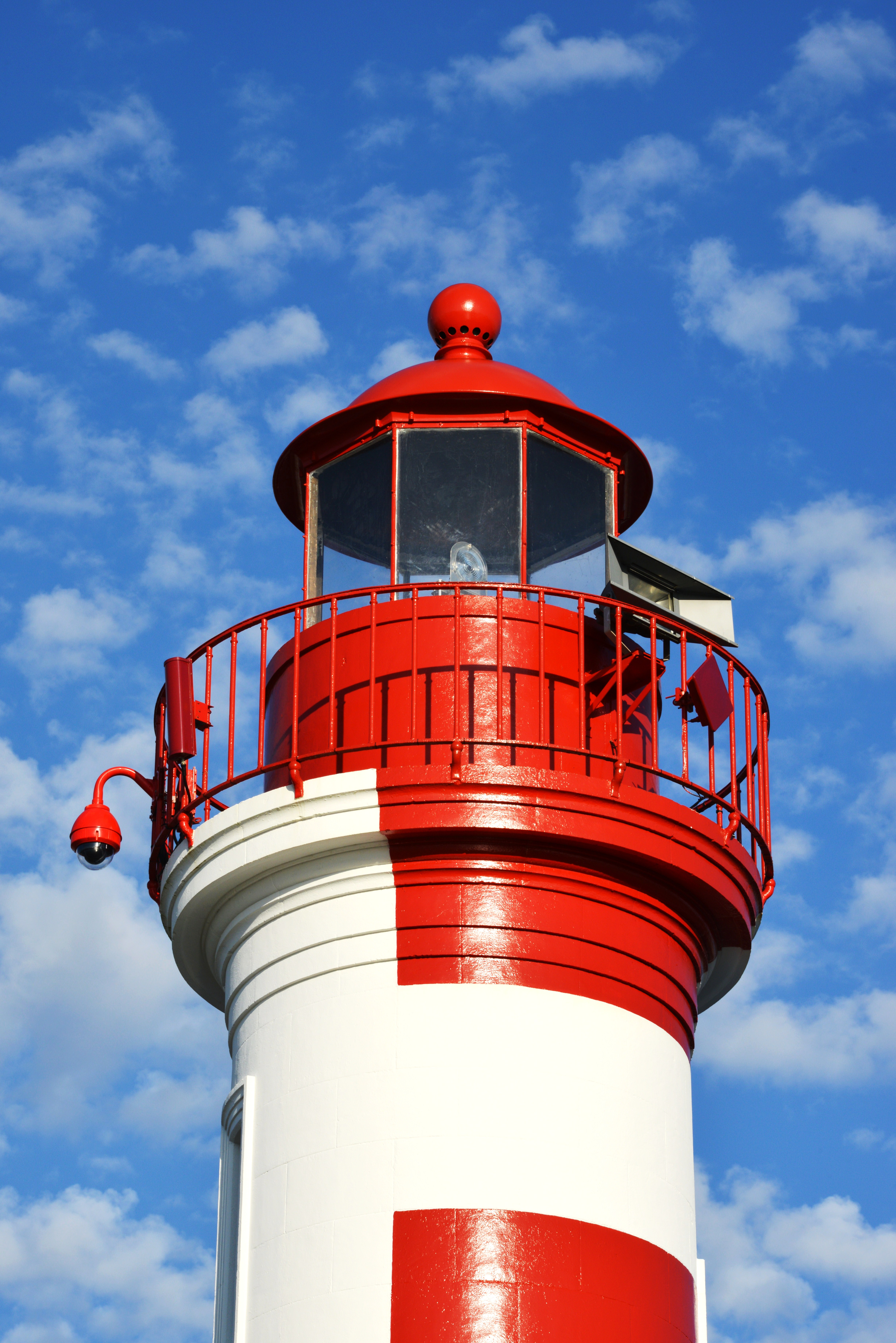
PTZ camera, Gabut lighthouse, Charente Maritime, France

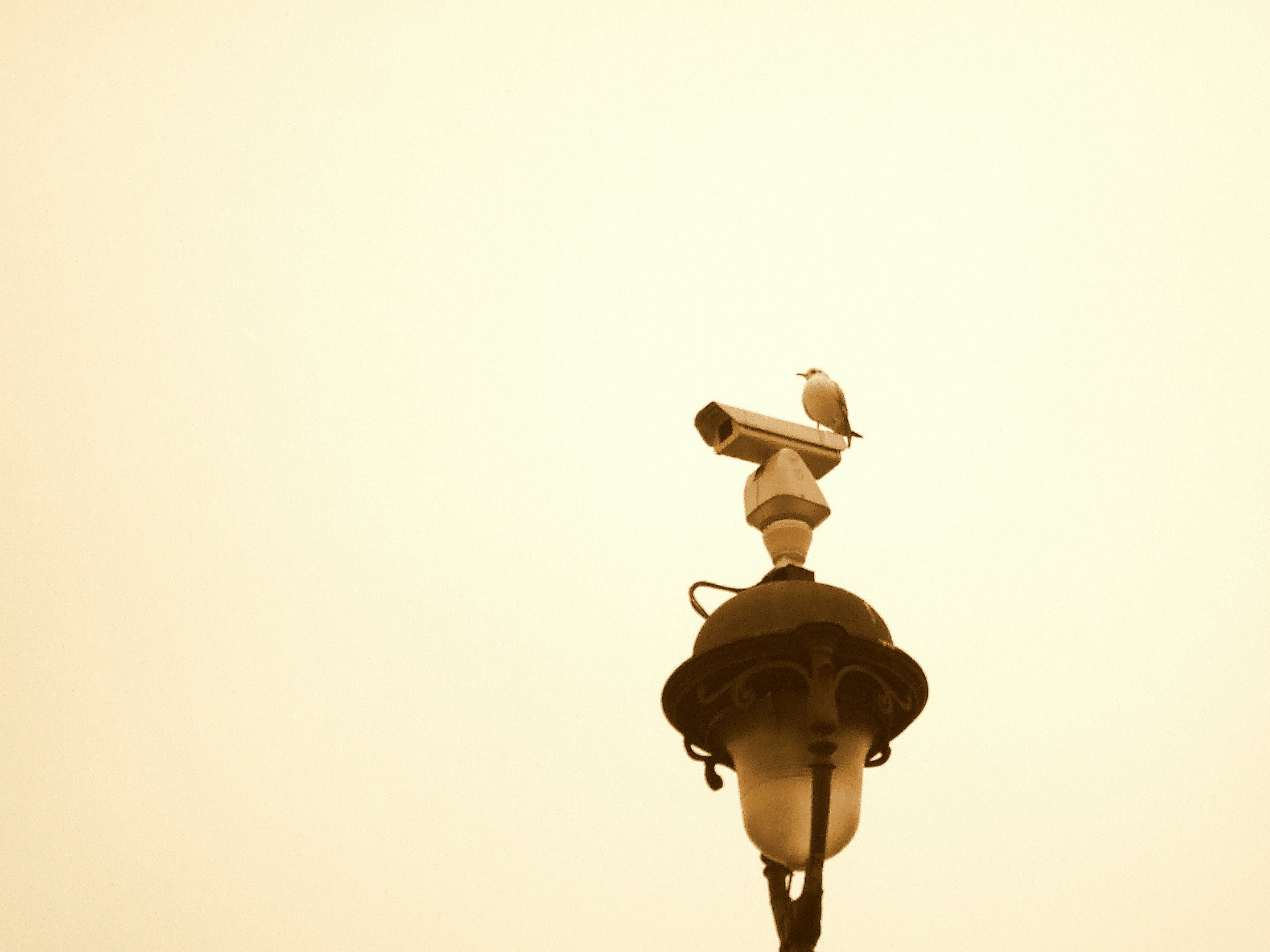
Bullet style camera, la Sainte Trinité, France

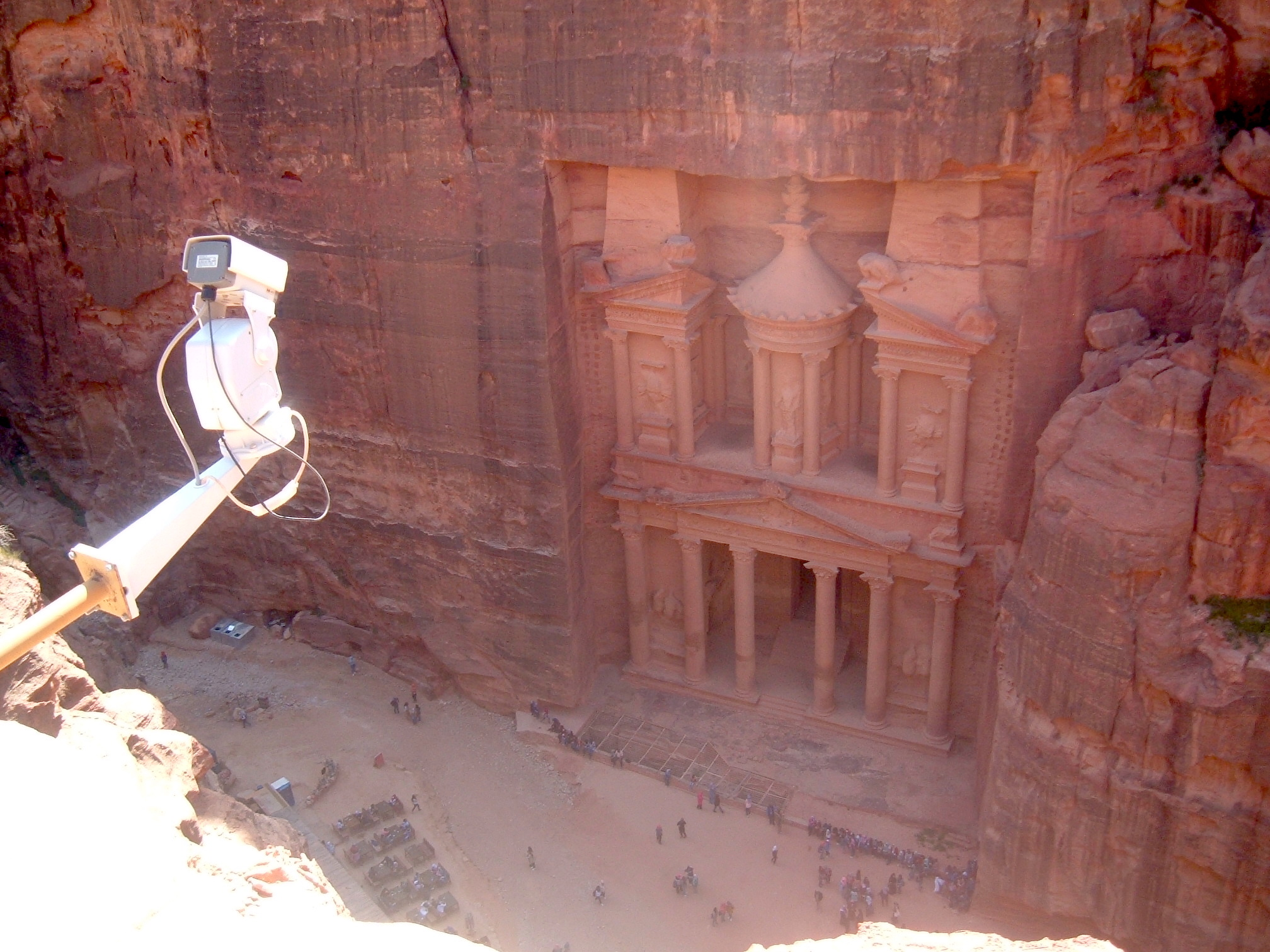
Bullet style camera, Al-Khazneh, Petra, Jordan

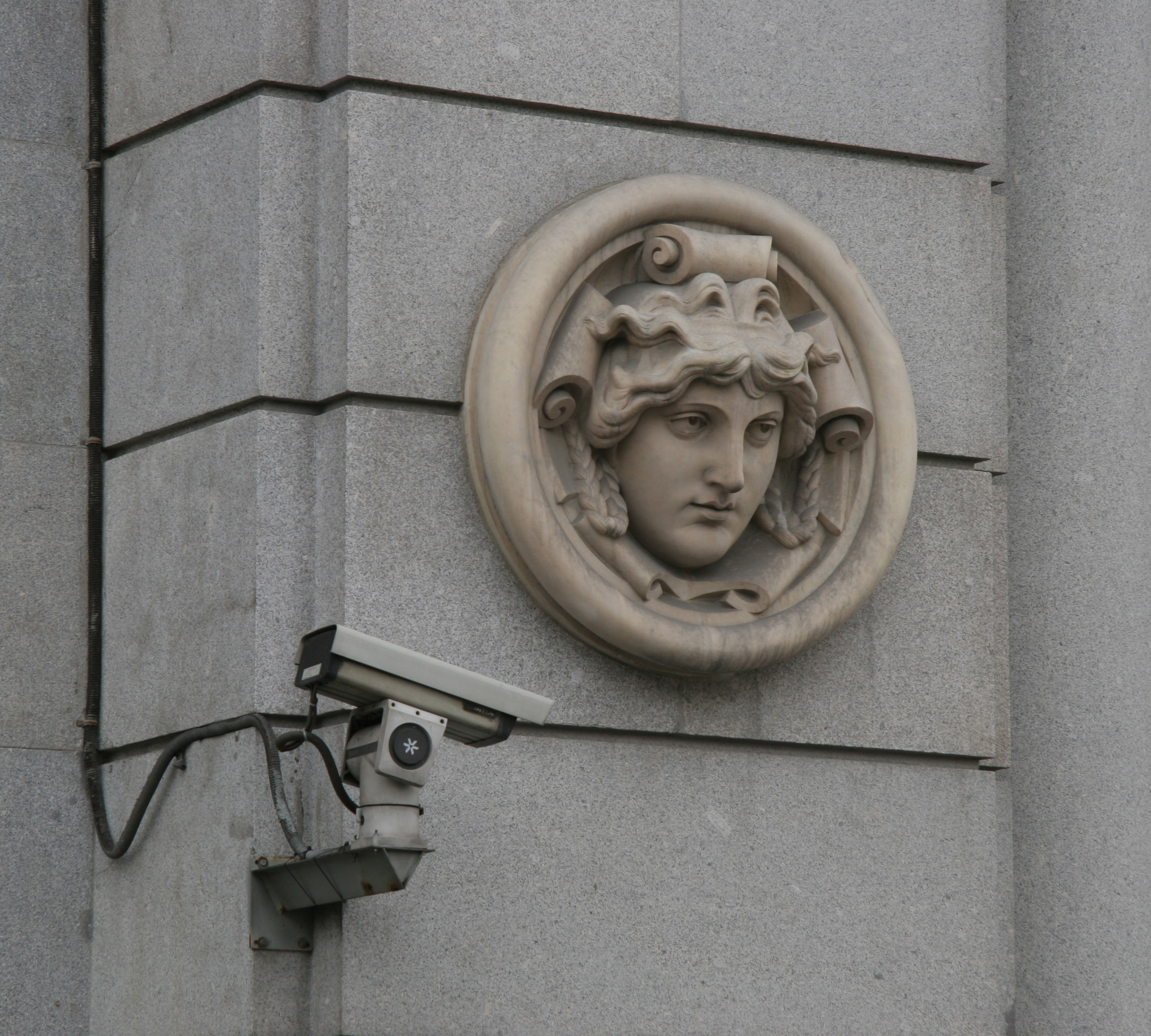
Bullet style camera, Bank of Spain, Madrid, Spain

== See also ==
- Closed-circuit television
- Network camera
- Trail camera
