= NDCP =

NDCP could either mean:

- National Defense College of the Philippines, an educational, training, and research agency under the Department of National Defense of the government of the Philippines.
- Network Device Control Protocol
- NDC Partnership or National Determinded Contributions Partnership under the Paris Climate Agreement
