= Hard disk recorder =

Hardware system that records audio and digital video

A hard disk recorder (HDR) is a system that uses a high-capacity hard disk to record digital audio or digital video. Hard disk recording systems represent an alternative to reel-to-reel audio tape recording and video tape recorders, and provide non-linear editing capabilities unavailable using tape recorders. Audio HDR systems, which can be standalone or computer-based, are typically combined with provisions for digital mixing and processing of the audio signal to produce a digital audio workstation (DAW).

Direct-to-disk recording (DDR) refers to methods which may also use optical disc recording technologies such as DVD, and Compact disc.

== History ==
Prior to the 1980s, most recording studios used analog multitrack recorders, typically based on reel-to-reel tape. The first commercial hard disk recording system was the Sample-to-Disk 16-bit, 50 kHz digital recording option for the New England Digital Synclavier II in 1982. Stereo audio was not immediately available due to data input and output limitations on hard drives of that time. The high cost and limited capacity of these solutions limited their use to large professional audio recording studios, and even then, they were usually reserved for specific applications such as film post-production.

With the arrival of the compact disc in 1982, digital recording became a major area of development by equipment makers. Several affordable solutions were released during the late 1980s and early 90s; many of these continued to use tape, either in reels or in more manageable videocassettes. In 1993, iZ Technology Corporation developed RADAR (Random Access Digital Audio Recorder distributed by Otari), designed to replace 24-track tape machines. By the mid-1990s, with the steady decline of hard disk prices and the corresponding increases in capacity and portability, the cost of hard disk recording systems had dropped to the point where they became affordable for even smaller studios. Hard disk systems have since become the preferred method for studio recording.

On January 14, 2004, Engineers from Fairlight, WaveFrame and AMS were awarded Academy Scientific and Technical Awards for the development of hard disk recording technology

== Operation ==
One major advantage of recording audio to a hard disk is that it allows for non-linear editing. Audio data can be accessed randomly and therefore can be edited non-destructively, that is, the original material is not changed in any way. Non-linear editing is not inherent to every hard-disk recording system, however. Different manufacturers implement different degrees of this facility.

Hard disk recorders are often combined with a digital mixing console and are an integral part of a digital audio workstation (DAW). In this form, complex tasks can be automated, freeing the audio engineer from performing a final mix in real time.

A personal computer can be used as a hard disk recorder with appropriate software; nowadays, this solution is often preferred, as it provides a more flexible interface to the studio engineer. Many studio-grade systems provide external hardware, particularly for the analog-to-digital conversion stages, while less expensive software systems can use the sound card included with any modern computer.

The major constraints on any hard disk recording system are the storage capacity, transfer rate, and processor speed. Some systems use lossy audio compression to minimize the first two factors. This solution is becoming increasingly rare, thanks to rapid increases in hard disk capacity.

== Products ==
Stand-alone hard disk recorders are able to record audio or video without requiring a computer. Examples of notable stand-alone hard disk recorders and manufacturers include Alesis, Akai Professional, Fostex, Korg, Mackie, TASCAM, Roland Corporation, Yamaha Pro Audio, RADAR and Zoom HD8 and HD16.

Miniaturization of recording and storage technology for consumer video already allows the non-professional user to directly record home movies to a permanent storage medium like DVD.

DDRs have replaced Magnetic tape based DV, Digital8, 8mm Video Format, VHS and MicroMV video tape recorders.

Professional television studio DDRs video servers are being used to replace video tape recorders (VTR)s and VTR Cart machines, that playout television commercials and TV shows. DAWs are used in professional audio recording studios. Computer software can implement a hard disk recorder function.

== Applications ==
Consumer applications include camcorders to high-end tapeless camcorders, digital video recorder (DVR) and set top box models like TiVo and personal computer based recorders. More professional applications include non-linear editing (NLE) systems like Avid Technology video editing systems, recording television productions/filmmaking in the field with professional video cameras in digital cinematography for digital cinema productions. Hard disk recorders are used in professional television studio from small systems able to record 2 hours to large multi-port playout systems supporting hundreds of hours of material.

== See also ==
- DTE (direct to edit)
- DVD recorder
- Home recording
- SMPTE timecode
