= Network Device Control Protocol =

Network Device Control Protocol (NDCP) is an automation system to control devices in realtime across IP networks, including the internet. It was designed to be a successor to the VDCP (Video Disk Control Protocol).

It was designed by Laurent Grumbach who at the time was an engineer with Harris Broadcast. Previous to that he had worked for Louth Automation which was acquired by Harris. NDCP was designed to be a network based protocol instead of the traditional serial connection protocols to Broadcast devices. NDCP was an XML compliant protocol and loosely based on the concepts of SOAP. The intent was that vendors would standardize their Broadcast devices on a single protocol instead of each vendor offering proprietary protocols for their devices. The use of a network based protocol would also allow the devices to be remote from the controlling application and not limited by the connection length of an RS422 serial line.
