= Video server =

Device that is dedicated to delivering video

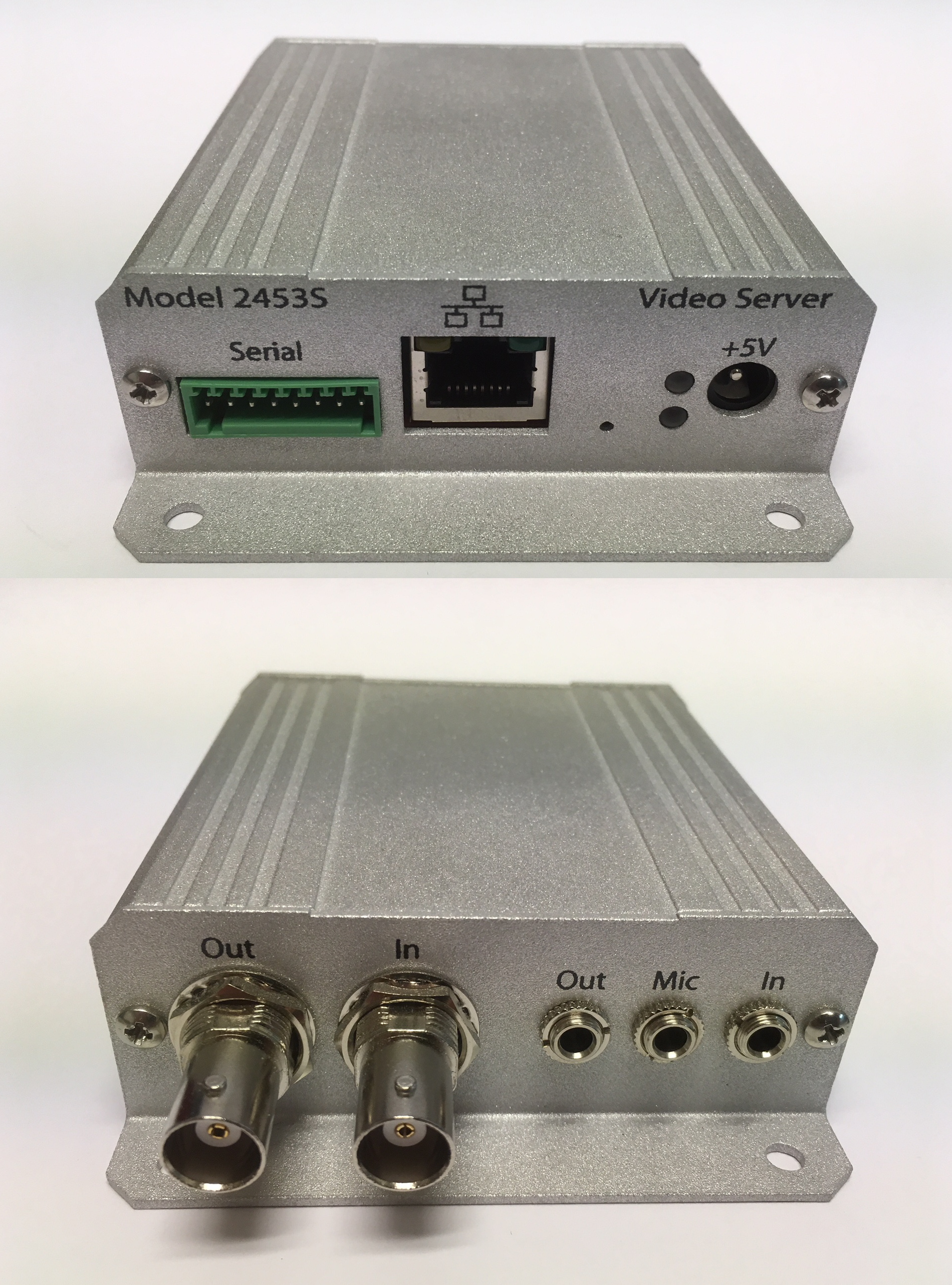
Front and back views of a small IP video server with audio and composite video inputs (Sensoray 2453S)

A video server is a computer-based device that is dedicated to delivering video. Video servers are used in a number of applications, and often have additional functions and capabilities that address the needs of particular applications. For example, video servers used in security, surveillance and inspection applications typically are designed to capture video from one or more cameras and deliver the video via a computer network. In video production and broadcast applications, a video server may have the ability to record and play recorded video, and to deliver many video streams simultaneously.

== Video broadcast and production ==
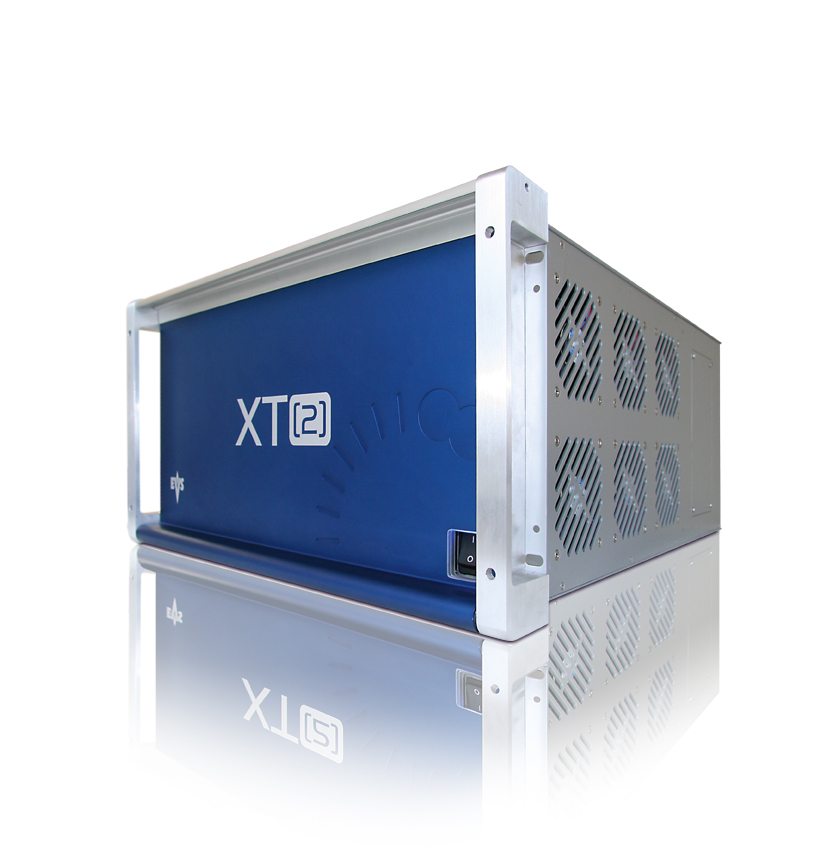
A video replay server, commonly used to provide instant replay in broadcasts of sporting events (EVS XT2)

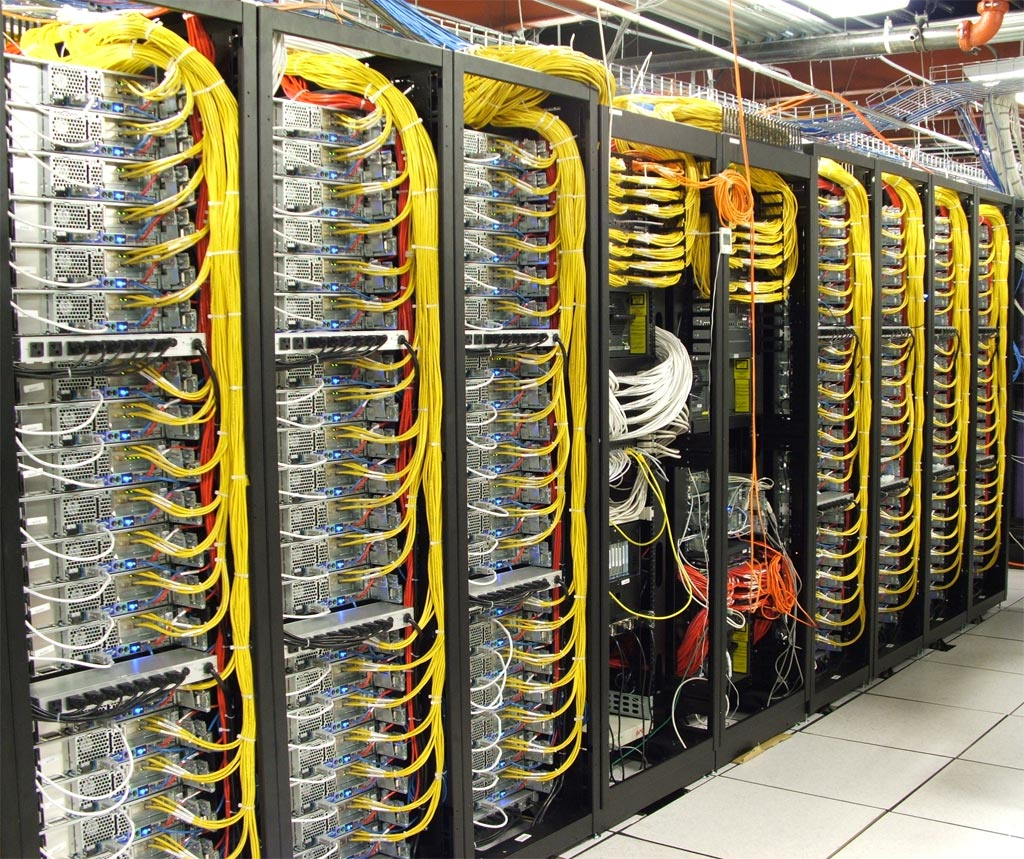
Large online providers of video on-demand employ clusters of servers such as this to simultaneously output multiple streams (Emulab)

In TV broadcast industries, a server is a device used to store broadcast quality images and allows several users to edit stories using the images they contain simultaneously.

The video server can be used in a number of contexts, some of which include:

- News: providing short news video clips as part of a news broadcast as seen on networks such as CNN, Fox News and the BBC.
- Production: enhance live events with instant replays and slow motion and highlights (sport production) (see OB Vans)
- Instruction: delivering course material in video format.
- Public Access: delivering city specific information to residents over a cable system.
- Surveillance: deliver real-time video images of protected site.
- Entertainment: deliver anything used for entertainment. It can be gaming, news, movie trailers, or movies.

A professional-grade video server performs recording, storage, and playout of multiple video streams without any degradation of the video signal. Broadcast quality video servers often store hundreds of hours of compressed audio and video (in different codecs), play out multiple and synchronised simultaneous streams of video by, and offer quality interfaces such as SDI for digital video and XLR for balanced analog audio, AES/EBU digital audio and also Time Code. A genlock input is usually provided to provide a means of synchronizing with the house reference clock, thereby avoiding the need for timebase correction or frame synchronizers.

Video servers usually offer some type of control interface allowing them to be driven by broadcast automation systems that incorporate sophisticated broadcast programming applications. Popular protocols include VDCP and the 9-Pin Protocol.

They can optionally allow direct to disk recording using the same codec that is used in various post-production video editing software packages to prevent any wasted time in transcoding.

=== Features ===
Typically, a video server can do the following:

- Ingest of different sources : video cameras (multiple angles), satellite data feeds, disk drives and other video servers. This can be done in different codecs.
- Temporary or definitive storage of these video feeds.
- Maintain a clear structure of all stored media with appropriate metadata to allow fast search : name, remarks, rating, date, time code, etc.
- video editing of the different clips
- Transfer those clips to other video servers or playout directly (via IP interface or SDI)

Generally, they have several bi directional channels (record and ingest) for video and audio. A perfect synchronisation is necessary between those channels to manage the feeds.

== Video surveillance and inspection ==
In some surveillance and inspection applications, IP video servers are employed which convert analog video signals into IP video streams. These IP video servers can stream digitized video over IP networks in the same way that an IP camera can. Because an IP Video server uses IP protocols, it can stream video over any IP-compatible network, including via a modem for access over a phone or ISDN connection. With the use of a video server attached to an analog camera, the video from an existing surveillance system can be converted and networked into a new IP surveillance system.

In the video security industry a video server is a device to which one or more video sources can be attached. Video servers are used to give existing analog systems network connectivity. Video servers are essentially transmission/ telemetry / monitoring devices. Viewing is done using a web browser or in some cases supplied software. These products also allow the upload of images to the internet or direct viewing from the internet. In order to upload to the internet an account with an ISP (internet service provider) may be required.

Phone apps that send direct security video feed to smartphones from security video servers are another recent security video server application innovation. This allows smartphone users to view security video server feed from anywhere they can use their smartphone.

== See also ==
- Broadcast automation and playout
- Centralcasting
- Media server (Consumer)
