= Music scheduling system =

Systems used at radio stations

Music scheduling systems are employed to sequence music at radio stations. Although these systems were originally implemented by manual index card methods, since the late 1970s they have exploited the efficiency and speed of digital computers. They are essential tools for broadcasting by music radio stations.

These systems are databases of the songs in active rotation at a radio station, plus an ample set of rules for sequencing them in accordance with specific policies. For example, there may be restrictions on how much time must pass between two songs by the same artist, or whether a song played during noontime today may be heard at noontime tomorrow (or not). There are also rules for what kinds of songs may succeed another according to tempos or other characteristics.

Many people believe that disc jockeys at radio stations are responsible for choosing the music which is heard on their shows. In reality, playlists for each hour of the day have usually been generated in advance by a radio station's program director using a music scheduling system. This ensures that the station programming is optimal and adheres to the policies and objectives of the station's management. These policies and objectives are usually designed to please the greatest number of people inside the radio station's demographic target, and garner the best ratings possible for the radio station. However, there are some radio stations, for example those of BBC, which do allow most (but not all) disc jockeys to choose the music themselves without obligations, as these stations cover an eclectic range of genres. In addition, shows from resident/guest disc jockeys (particularly on mainstream stations) also do not need the program director's opinion for their playlists.

Music scheduling is simply the function of generating a playlist. Other systems are responsible for actually reproducing the music.

The first widely used commercial music scheduler for radio is Selector, originally written by Dr. Andrew Economos of Radio Computing Services, Inc, in 1979. A-ware MusicMaster (called Musicscan at the time) followed in 1983. The third most commonly used music scheduler, Powergold, was released in 1988. Today, Selector, MusicMaster and PowerGold are the three most widely used music scheduling applications in broadcasting.

Scheduling, in the general radio broadcasting sense, is the placement of content against a linear timeline for transmission on a broadcast station. This content may include not only music, but also commercial advertisements, station identifiers and promotional jingles. Commercial advertisements, called spots in radio lingo, are scheduled by their own separate scheduling system, called a 'traffic system' which keeps track of monetary considerations. The music schedule, non-music schedule (jingles, promos) and the commercial schedule are later merged into a single schedule (called the log) to guide what must be played on the station on a minute-by-minute basis.

When considering the internet as a new broadcast medium, the definition of scheduling could be broadened "to curate or arrange a linear playlist of video/audio content for live transmission or on-demand distribution." This would apply to both internet distribution and traditional broadcasting.

== See also ==
- Broadcast programming
- Rotation (broadcast programming)

== External links and references ==
- Selector web site
- MusicMaster web site
- Powergold web site
- SGP web site
- NextKast web site
