= Post-production =

Step in film, video, audio or photography process

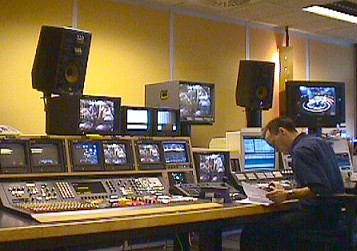
A studio video editing suite from the early 1990s

Post-production, also known simply as post, is part of the process of filmmaking, video production, audio production, and photography. Post-production includes all stages of production occurring after principal photography or recording individual program segments. Contrary to the name, however, post-production may occur at any point during the recording and production process.

The traditional first part of the post-production process, non-linear (analog) film editing, has mostly been replaced by digital or video editing software, which operates as a non-linear editing (NLE) system. The advantage of non-linear editing is the ability to edit scenes out of order, thereby making creative changes at will. This flexibility facilitates carefully shaping the film in a thoughtful, meaningful way for emotional effect.

Once the production team is satisfied with the picture editing, the editing is said to be locked. At this point, the turnover process begins, in which the picture is prepared for lab and color finishing, and the sound is spotted and turned over to the composer and sound designers for sound design, composing, and sound mixing.

Laypersons unfamiliar with post-production are often frustrated to discover that an eagerly awaited film shooting right now will not be released until several months or years in the future. Post-production work requires anywhere from six months for a small film to over a year for a film laden with visual effects.

== Processes ==
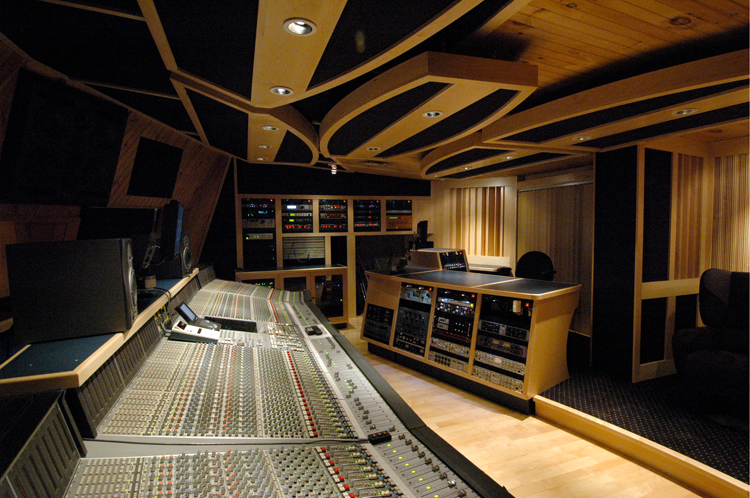
A sound control room at Tainted Blue Studios, 2010

Post-production consists of many different processes grouped under one name. These typically include:

- When content is shot on film it is typically transferred to video, DPX, OpenEXR with a telecine or a more modern motion picture film scanner.
- Editing the content of the film or television program.
- Writing, recording and re-recording, and editing the soundtrack.
- Adding visual effects – mainly computer-generated imagery (CGI) which is then composited into the frame.
- Sound design, sound effects, ADR, Foley, and music, culminating in a process known as sound re-recording or mixing with professional audio equipment.
- Stereoscopic 3D conversion in the case of content that was shot in 2D which is scheduled to have a 3D release.
- Color grading (and color correction) in a color suite.
- Subtitling, closed captioning, or dubbing.

The post-production phase of creating a film usually takes longer than the actual shooting of the film. It can take several months to complete, because it includes the complete editing, color correction, and the addition of music and sound. The process of editing a movie is also seen as the second directing, because through post-production it is possible to change the intention of the movie.

Furthermore, through the use of color grading tools and the addition of music and sound, the atmosphere of the movie can be heavily influenced. For instance, a blue-tinted movie may evoke cold in one way or another. The choice of music and sound will alter the dramatic effect of the scenes that they accompany.

== Television ==
In television, the phases of post-production include: editing, video editing, color correction, assembly, sound editing, re-recording, animation and visual effects insertions, combining separately edited audio and video tracks back together and delivering for broadcast.

== Photography ==
Professional post-producers usually apply a certain range of image editing operations to the raw image format provided by a photographer or an image bank. There is a range of proprietary and free and open-source software running on a range of operating systems available to do this work.

The first stage of post-production usually requires loading the raw images into the post-production software. If there is more than one image, and they belong to a set, ideally post-producers try to equalize the images before loading them. After that, if needed, the next step is to cut the objects in the images with the pen tool for a clean, precise cut. The next stage would be cleaning the image using tools such as the healing tool, clone tool, and patch tool.

The next stages depend on what the client ordered. If it is a photo montage, the post-producers would usually start assembling the different images into the final document and begin to integrate the images with the background.

In advertising, it usually requires assembling several images together in a photo composition.

Types of work usually done:

- Advertising that requires one background (as one or more images to assemble) and one or more models. (Usually the most time-consuming, as often these are image bank images which do not have much quality, and they all have different light and color as they were not controlled by only one photographer in one set location.)
- Product photography that usually requires several images of the same object assembled together to control lighting and unwanted reflections.
- Fashion photography that usually requires heavy post-production for editorial or advertising.

== Music ==
Techniques used in music post-production include comping (short for compositing, or compiling the best portions of multiple takes into a single composite take), timing and pitch correction (perhaps through beat quantization), and adding effects. This process is typically referred to as mixing and can also involve equalization and adjusting the levels of each individual track to provide an optimal sound experience.

== See also ==
- 2-pop
- Cinematic techniques
- Color suite
- Direct to disk recording
- DTE (direct to edit)
- Dubbing
- Film editing
- Film score
- Linear video editing
- Negative cutting
- Non-destructive editing
- Non-linear editing system (NLE)
- Offline editing
- Outline of film
- Pre-production
- Sound editor (filmmaking)
- Sound effect
- Special effect
- Stock footage
- Tapeless production
- Tapeless camcorder
- Video editing
- Video editing software
- Video server
