= Video Disk Control Protocol =

Communication protocol

Video Disk Control Protocol (VDCP) is a proprietary communications protocol primarily used in broadcast automation to control hard disk video servers for broadcast television. VDCP was originally developed by Louth Automation and is commonly called the Louth Protocol. At the time it was developed, Hewlett Packard (whose broadcast server division was eventually sold to Pinnacle Systems) and Tektronix were both bringing to market the first of the VideoFile Servers to be used in the broadcast industry. They contacted Louth Automation who then designed the communications protocol basing it on Sony protocols of both the Sony LMS Storage Device and the Sony VTR. The principal work was carried out by Ken Louth at Louth Automation.

VDCP uses a tightly coupled master-slave methodology. The controlling device takes the initiative in communications between the controlling broadcast automation device and the controlled device (video disk). VDCP conforms to the Open Systems Interconnection (OSI) reference model.

VDCP is a serial communications protocol based on RS-422. It is derived from the Sony 9-Pin Protocol, an industry-standard protocol for control of professional broadcast VTRs that is used in online editing.

Full details of the protocol are available from Imagine Communications who, as Harris Broadcast, acquired Louth in 2000.

It was largely succeeded by the Network Device Control Protocol.
