= Tourism Radio =

Travel technology company based in Cape Town, South Africa

Tourism Radio is a travel technology company based in Cape Town, South Africa, which produces location-based technology used in customized GPS in-car devices and IOS and Android mobile applications. The technology allows the user to take a tour of a city or pre-defined area, with geo-located, pre-recorded audio travel information triggering automatically as the user approaches them. The Tourism Radio in-car device plugs into a standard vehicle cigarette lighter and broadcasts a selection of local and international music along with location-specific travel information about the area the vehicle is driving through. Currently, there are approximately 3,300 of these devices used in South Africa, Namibia, New Zealand and Angola. Distribution of the devices to tourists is done in partnership with local Destination Marketing Organisations (DMOs) and car/motorhome rental agencies. The iOS and Android applications do not broadcast a selection of music, but use the same geo-location principle to give the user relevant travel information about the area they are in. This includes information about a general area or suburb, as well as information about specific points of interest, such as museums, art galleries, historical attractions, restaurants, nature walks, beaches, etc.

== About ==
Started in Cape Town, South Africa in 2005 by founder and current CEO, Mark Allewell, Tourism Radio was originally created on the concept of touring a city without a tour guide. Allewell used his home town of Cape Town as his starting point, and worked on the development of a GPS device which would play information on points of interest as the user approached them. Months of research and development led to the creation of a bespoke, in-car device. This could play through an ordinary car radio sound system and would play audio information about important sights as they were passed by the vehicle. After a positive local and international response, the company was bought by a German angel investor and expanded operations to Spain and New Zealand. Tourism Radio has since focused on becoming a key player in the digital world by creating mobile apps, with a keen focus on free-to-download audio city guides, for iOS and Android devices. These apps served as a proving ground for Tourism Radio, and led to the development of white label apps for DMOs and corporate entities looking to target the tourism industry. These use Tourism Radio’s technology and are coupled with client-provided content to create company-specific apps.

== Technology ==
Tourism Radio offers the use of its location-based technology in form of the in-car Tourism Radio devices and its iOS and Android applications. The company has patented its real-world and mobile geo-location technology in New Zealand and Europe, with patents pending in North America and elsewhere. Tourism Radio also features as application software on the Renault R-Link in-car multimedia system. Tourism Radio uses the R-Link's inbuilt GPS system to provide drivers with information about tourist attractions in their vicinity. The Tourism Radio mobile applications for Android and iOS allow the user to download a travel guide and then use it completely offline.

== See also ==
- Tourist information

== Sources ==
- Advantage Rent A Car Partners With Tourism Radio
- Tourism Radio launches in NZ
- Walk the Talk with Tourism Radio
- Tuning in to Tourism Radio
- Tourism Radio launched in Cape Town
- Tourism Radio helps visitors find their way
- Renault launches in-car tablet, R-Link
- SA-developed app coming to Renault cars
- Tourism Radio Official Site
