= MusicMaster (software) =

Music scheduling software

- Original author: Joseph Knapp
- Developer: A-Ware Software
- Release: 1983; 43 years ago
- Stable release: 6 / October 2015; 11 years ago
- Operating system: Microsoft Windows
- Website: www.musicmaster.com
- As of: 2015

MusicMaster is a music scheduling software produced by A-Ware Software (aka MusicMaster, Inc. of Dallas, Texas USA) and used by radio, Internet and television stations. Their main office is located in Dallas, Texas.

== History ==
MusicMaster was created in 1983 by Joseph Knapp, an engineer, radio programmer and on-air personality for several stations in Ohio and Wisconsin, United States. Knapp believed that the decision-making process of selecting music for airplay could best be done using computers. In 1983, Knapp began writing a program he called Revolve, meant to improve the rotation of songs for airplay. Previously, music scheduling had been done by hand, as disc jockeys selected a song card from the front of a stack, played the track, and returned the card to the back of the stack to ensure that it was equally rotated with all available songs. With the use of computers, better decisions could be made based on a set of programmable rules. For instance, the rule of artist separation would ensure that two songs by the same artist needed to be separated by a given amount of time.

After selling the first copy of MusicMaster to WCXI-FM/Detroit, Knapp rewrote the program for the Radio Shack TRS-80 and then for the IBM PC. By 1985, it was licensed for distribution by Tapscan and sold as MusicScan. When a legal dispute ended A-ware's relationship with Tapscan in 1994, Knapp formed his own company and distributed the program as MusicMaster. In 2001, MusicMaster was ported to Microsoft Windows.

== Overview ==
The heart of MusicMaster is a music database, which is custom built to the user's specifications. This database can include information such as song title, artist, trivia, and any other information the user needs to identify each song. The users can also add attributes to each song to identify the type, era, tempo, mood and other factors that will be used by MusicMaster to control the flow, balance and mix of the scheduled playlists using scheduling rules. The user creates rules based on these attributes using MusicMaster's Rule Tree system.

The user assigns the songs to any number of different categories. These Categories are then requested in specific times and patterns throughout the day using any number of Format Clocks. The Categories allow some songs to rotate, or repeat, more often than others in the library. Usually, the newer and more popular songs are heard more often, while the older established hits are heard less frequently.

In addition to scheduling rules, MusicMaster also offers an Optimum Goal Scheduling system that selects the best possible song based on a combination of weighted scores. These scores are a measure of the variance from the calculated ideal music rotation as indicated by the rotational mathematics of the music library and Format Clock assignments. The song closest to "perfect" is the one selected for airplay in each position on the playlist. Users can export the MusicMaster playlists to files that are compatible with most radio and television automation systems, such as WideOrbit's WO Automation for Radio, as well as many popular media players.

The balance and rotation of non-music elements, such as jingles and sweepers, are also controlled by MusicMaster. Users can automatically match sweepers and jingles to specific song attributes such as artist, tempo, or genre.

MusicMaster also offers a Nexus Server that allows third-party developers to directly access and update the MusicMaster scheduling intelligence, database, and playlists through their own software systems for real-time synchronization of data. Broadcast software products such as traffic and billing, research analysis and web services may use the Nexus Server to interact directly with a MusicMaster database.

In April 2016, MusicMaster introduced MusicMaster CS, a client-server based version of their popular music scheduling system. The complete product line also includes MusicMaster Solo Edition, designed for individual radio stations in small markets, and MusicMaster Personal Edition, perfect for hobby Internet broadcasters, retail background music, and personal entertainment.

In September 2016, A-Ware Software relocated to Dallas, Texas. With that move, the corporate name was officially changed to MusicMaster, Inc.. The company maintained the original name, A-Ware Software, as a Texas corporate alias. The corporate headquarters are located at 8330 Lyndon B Johnson Freeway, Suite B1050, Dallas, Texas, USA 75243. The main phone number is 469-717-0100.

== Clientele ==
MusicMaster currently generates schedules for radio stations all over the world, as well as music television networks, satellite broadcasters, and cable television channels, Internet streams, syndicated programs, restaurants and nightclubs.

Clients include: SiriusXM Satellite Radio, Saga Communications, Inc., MTV Networks / Viacom, MusicChoice, Univision, Entercom, Emmis Communications, E. W. Scripps Company, Cox Media Group, Spanish Broadcasting, Midwest Communications, and many more across the globe.
