= Audicom =

World first system to record and play audio from a PC

AUDICOM
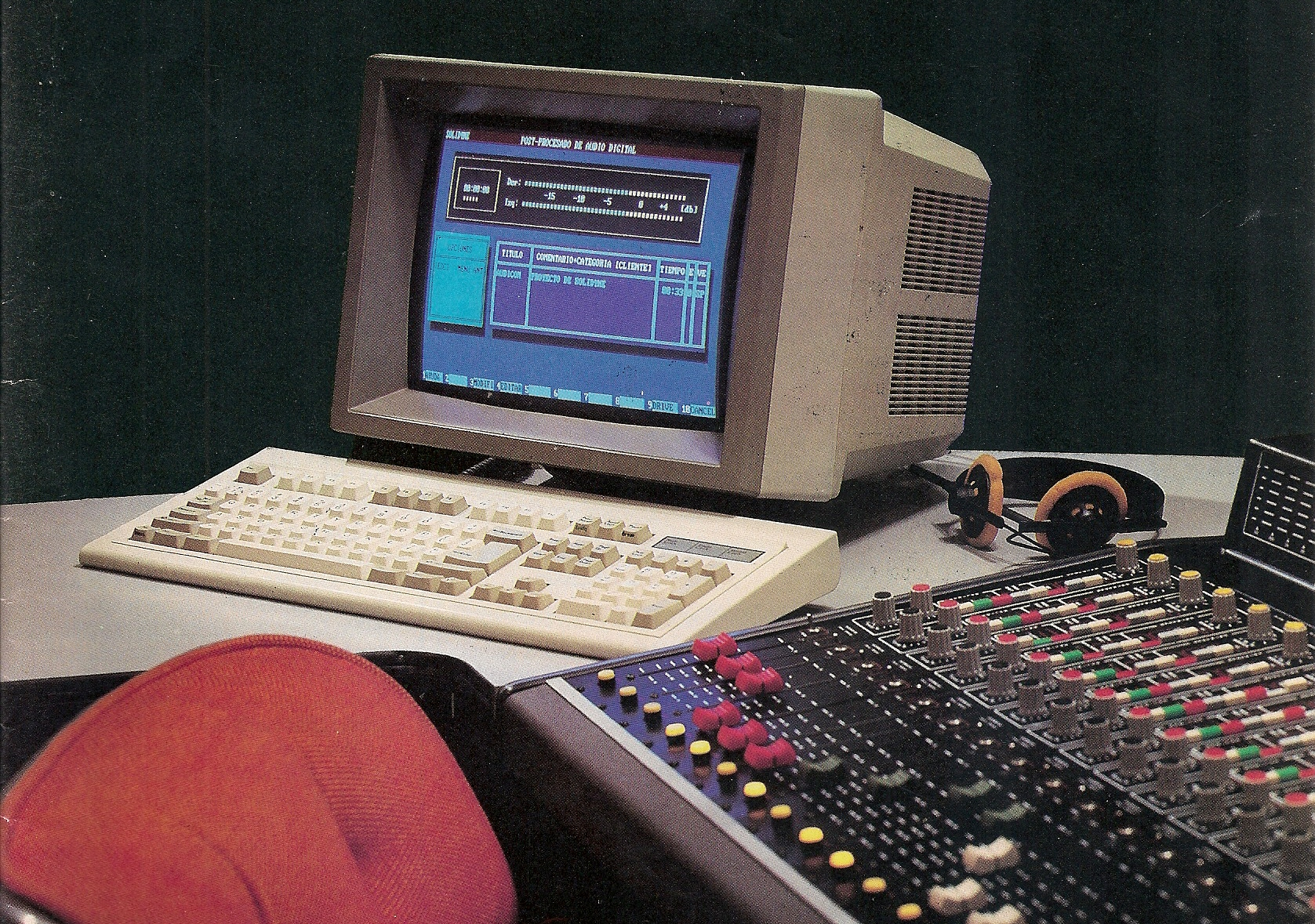
- Component type: The first PC audio Rec & Play system
- Inventor: July 1988, Solidyne, Argentina. Open use technology because Solidyne never claims for invention patents
- First produced: June 1989

Audicom was the first system to record and play broadcast-quality audio from an IBM-compatible personal computer, beginning in 1988 the era of digital recording that would eventually eliminate magnetic tape recording used previously for half a century.

== Invention ==
This technology was created in Argentina by a group of engineers led by Oscar Bonello, professor at the University of Buenos Aires, who began in 1982 to develop the idea of the digital recording on hard disk. This invention has changed the way we today record and reproduce sound or listen to it via streaming. The Audicom required the creation of a data compression technology that could reduce the size of digital audio files. This technology now named Perceptual Coding is the core of all the systems that we use every day to hear music using audio streaming. From his experience in the field of Psychoacoustics, Bonello considered that the solution to reduce digital data would be to transmit only a small fraction of it, selected to achieve masking of critical ear bands prevent noticing the absence of the missing information. This is a property of the human ear, known for many years, but without practical applications and which was used for the first time in this field. This idea was the forerunner of other forms of compression that appeared later such as MP3, AAC, Opus, etc. that were based exactly on the same principle of psychoacoustics. It was also necessary to invent the world's first audio card to be able to faithfully record and reproduce audio in the 20 Hz to 20,000 Hz range.

The development team included several engineers, including Ricardo Sidoti and Elio Demaria, who made the hardware including the programmable logic gates. In turn, the driver and the user application were developed by Gustavo Pesci. Later, Sebastian Ledesma was added to the group, author of all the modern versions starting with Audicom 5. He used algorithms of artificial intelligence, to carry out the proposed technology of Bonello of an AutoDJ music scheduling system that works with the perfection of the best human DJ creating exact time blocks, previously impossible in broadcasting programs.

This invention was immediately applied in radio stations, sound systems, recording studios and sound in shows, achieving an immediate impact on audio engineering and even in journalistic media.

The development was carried out in Solidyne, a private company that paid for the costs of this project for 5 years. But the company understood that this invention was too important for millions of people to use it freely and decided not to apply for invention patents. To avoid future discussions about this invention and in order to give constancy of their existence as a commercial product of free availability, Solidyne published a note in the international edition of AES Journal that was the first offer of a product capable of recording and reproducing audio digitally from a standard PC. The release of patents allowed the rapid spread of audio recording and playback on PCs and later cell phones around the world.

== The first PC radio automation system ==
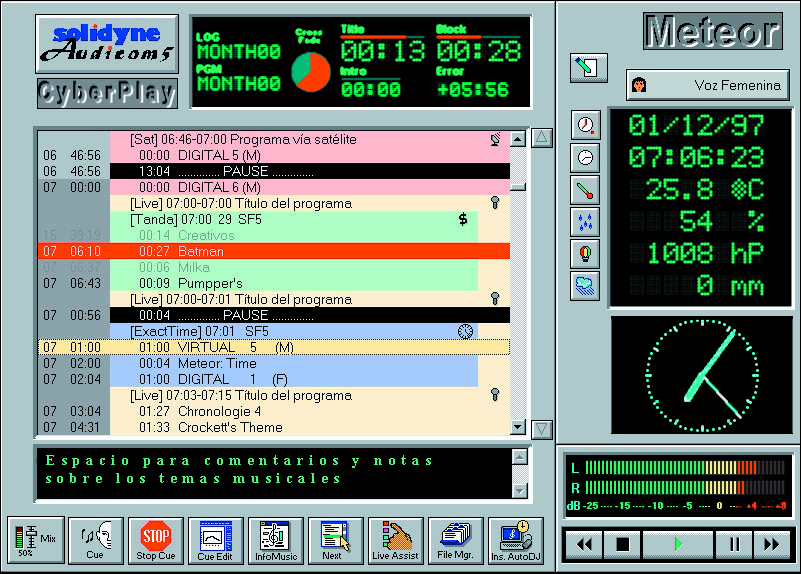
Old Audicom-5 working under Window 98

The first application of recording and playback on PC was in the automation of AM and FM radio stations. For this, an automation software was developed for music themes and commercial ads that was presented the following year, in 1989, in the Golden Room of the Argentine Communications Secretariat, today the CFK Cultural Center, before the press and the engineers of the broadcasting stations. In 1990 it was featured at the NAB (National Association of Broadcasters ) Exhibition in Atlanta, USA. It was the only system of its kind at the exhibition and prompted the NAB president to comment: "This is not just a new technology; it is the re-invention of the Radio ..." The Audicom was made up of user software that ran on an IBM PC and an audio card with hardware compression as it took many years for a PC to have the computing power necessary to process the audio data compression algorithms. Obviously, since there are no audio cards on the market, there were no manufacturers of integrated circuits for that task. The Audicom board was then designed using CMOS logic chips and performed hardware data compression in real time.

The software allows you to record music in various directories, or copy it from CDs or other sources. Also it records commercial announcements that were automatically armed based on commercial contracts with clients and advertising agencies. As of version 5.0 it was possible to use an automatic music scheduler' system, introducing artificial intelligence in this field. It was then possible get exact time music blocks using the AutoDJ with 0.5 sec precision. This blocks never cuts any music tune; simply by combining the duration of the songs and adding announcements from the radio programming and closing with an arpeggio. This allows to operate in exact time in order to synchronize several radio stations into a network. A system for remote journalistic reports with cell phones from anywhere in the world was also added as of version 9. The news is automatically sent to the air a few seconds later, the duration of this interruption being compensated with the next musical block made with AutoDJ of exact time in order to achieve that the non-programmed news does not change the times of the rest of the programming. Until today there is no other software that allows the exact time adjustment that AutoDJ does. Another novelty, in 1992, was the pre-recorded weather announcement based on the voices of three announcers that operated automatically. Audicom also included time ago a weather station for temperature, humidity and rain. Nowadays is it possible to get local weather data from geographically close airports.

== Audicom visual radio ==
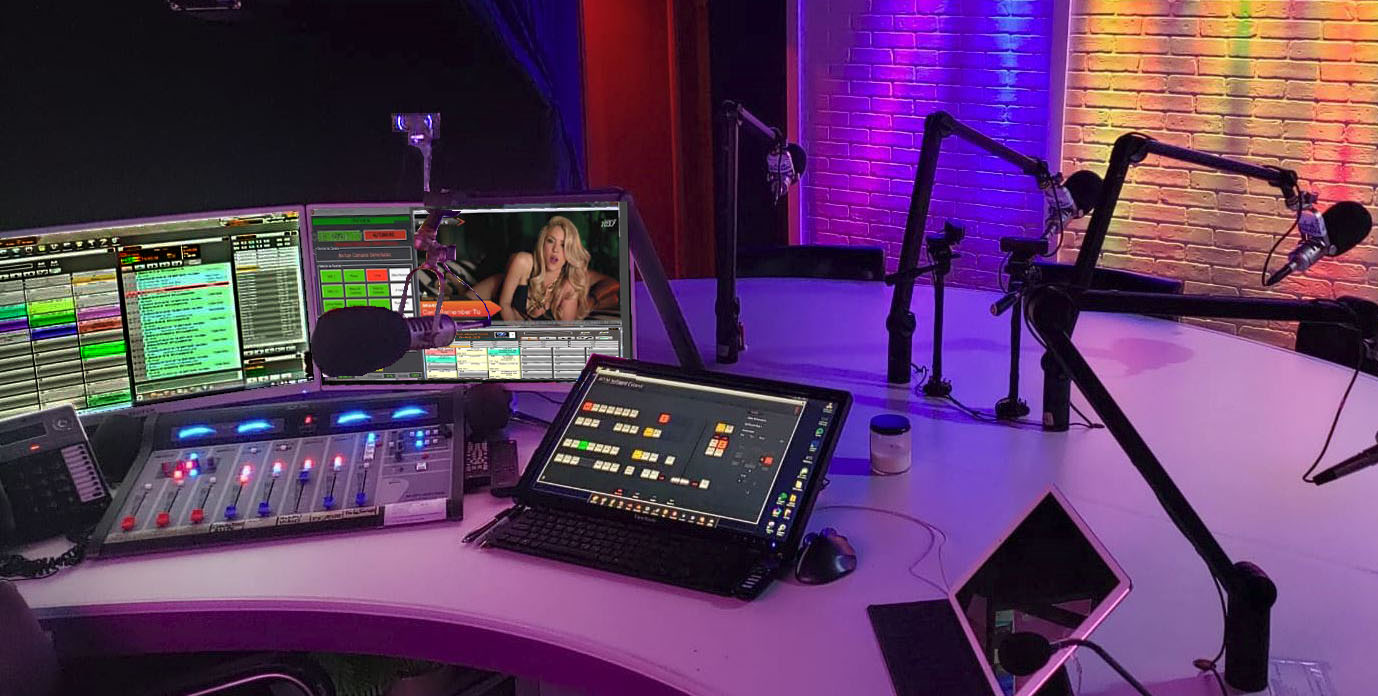
Visual Radio Studio with Audicom and CLOSE at the Xlevel radio station, Puerto Rico. The audio mixer switches TV cameras automatically.

Based on the old success of stereo radio transmissions combined with a television channel, Solidyne had the idea of providing the Audicom with the possibility of transmitting audio and video over the Internet simultaneously with the normal broadcast on FM / AM or in the form of WEB radio.

To do this, in 2012 a software module was created, which was added to the Audicom, called HDVmixer, whose mission is to handle video files and video cameras. The system was presented at the international CAPER 2013 exhibition, held in Buenos Aires. In 2016 the Audicom Video was presented at the NAB, Las Vegas, with the AVRA brand under which it is sold in the USA. The presentation was made by Alex Bonello, son of the founder of Solidyne, offering on behalf of his company InSoft the HDVmixer as a separate product and winning the Best of Show Award as the best product of the NAB exhibition. Today the HDVmixer continues to be sold to provide video to other automation programs. The idea that made the Audicom + HDVmixer successful was to prevent the audio operator from having to operate the video switcher. Therefore it was equipped with a mixer and automatic programmer of recorded videos and an automatic camera switching system that gave great agility to the video emission without recharging the tasks of the sound operator.

Automatic switching of video cameras: For this, sound direction sensors were initially used, located near the microphones, which determined what camera must be activated to show the faces of the journalists or guests who were speaking at that time to move from a general shot to a close-up. If the dialogue between two people was frequent in that case the screen was divided into two halves.

Audio Mixers with MIC detection: Later, to avoid the use of sensors and cables, the Solidyne audio consoles began to be manufactured with the option of having Mic level detection with USB or IP output. This inform the camera switcher software which of the microphones is active. These codes are supported by CLOSE RadioTV rental service.

Starting in 2018, when Visual Radio was gaining in popularity, with more than 900 stations on the air, it was noticed that the radio stations without computer engineers had problems to keep on air the visual radio with good quality. To solve this problem Audicom was modified to work with the CLOSE RadioTV, an on-line comprehensive service, created by Leonardo Bonello, which provides support for both; management of the cameras, streaming services and social media management with their own servers on several continents. This decision allowed to enhance the video quality and the flexibility of the system.

== History of Audicom audio cards ==
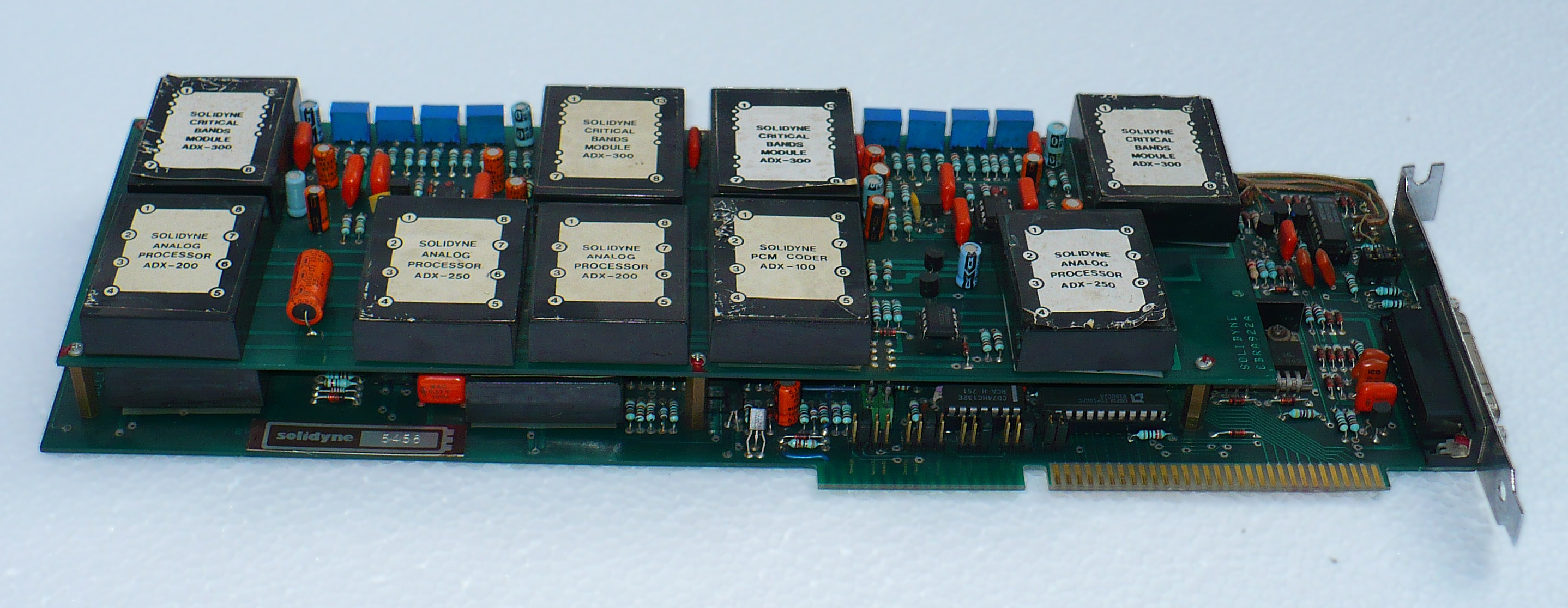
1988 Audicom ADX922 board; It was the world's first 16-bit PC stereo audio card. Made it possible to convert a PC into a professional sound quality digital audio recorder and reproducer system, replacing magnetic tape and cassette recorders that would disappear from the market. It works with ECAM compression up to 16: 1.

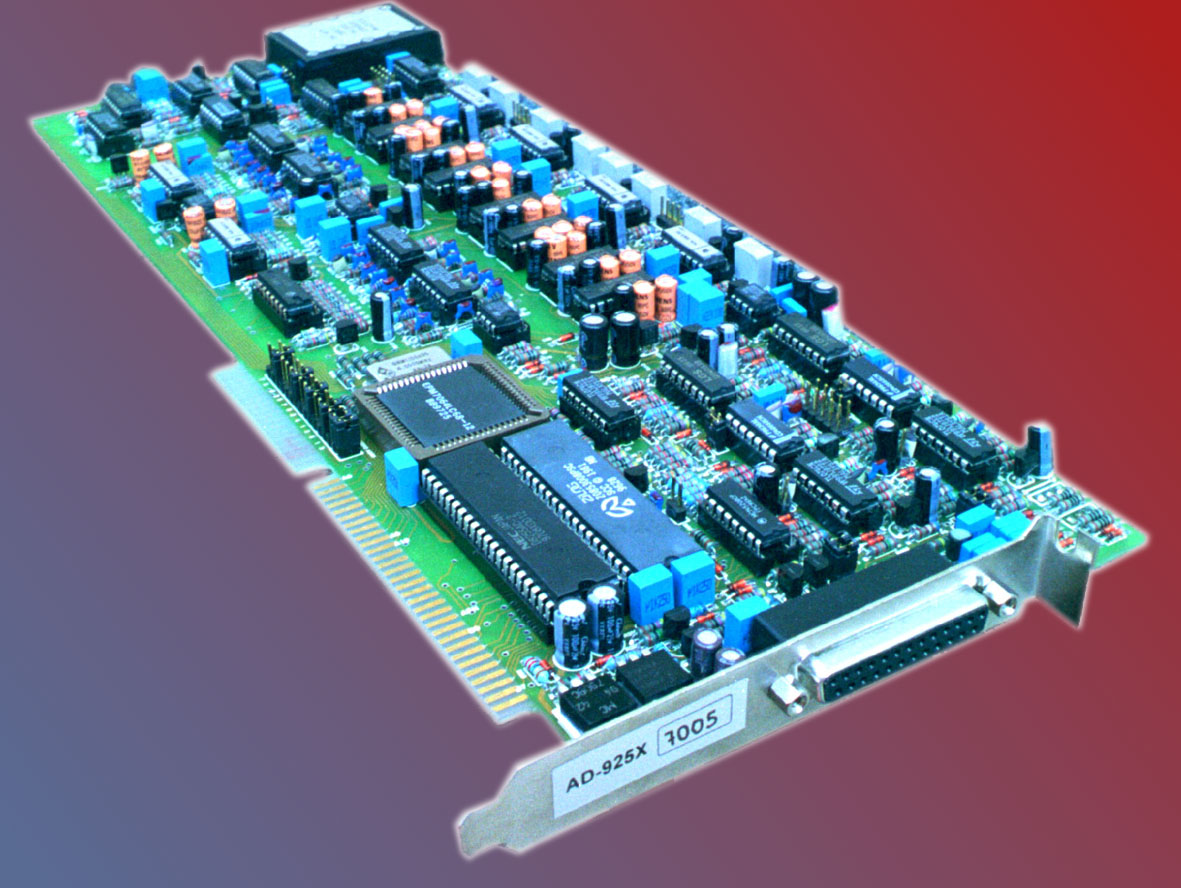
Reduced size 925X card, 1996

The original audio card was designed for the old ISA bus on the IBM PC and was powered by direct memory access from the computer.

Historic versions of the audio card

- ADX903: first version, monaural with synthesized stereo. With balanced inputs and outputs. It had GPIO connections through the old parallel port to control external devices.
- ADX922: hardware needed to operate in stereo with two separate channels was added to the 903 board. Resulting in a two-story plate.
- ADX925: offered a third mono output to preview audio files
- ADX925X: Integrated all the logic on one Altera FPGA chip, thus reverting to single-deck design.

== ECAM bit compression invention ==
ECAM was the name of the bit compression algorithm used initially in 1988 It divides the signal into four bands, to analyze and discard the masked signals in each sub-band. Egan-Hake masking curves from 1950 were used in its design To reduce the amount of data, A / D and D / A encoders of the delta-adaptive type were used originally created for narrow band communications but which were modified to operate between 20 Hz - 20 kHz

During the 5 years of development, hundreds of sound quality listening tests were carried out before an audience of people of various ages. The double-blind ABX method was used to make comparisons between the original and the compressed sound to refine the adjustment parameters until achieving the high sound quality required in FM broadcasting.

== History of the Audicom radio automation software ==
We quote the evolution of old versions

- Audicom (1988): first version, included the audio card with data compression: ADX903
- Audicom II (1989): it was the first version launched on the market in series. It used the DOS operating system. He introduced the concept of Playlist for computer systems, and created the concept of Live Assist (programmable push button at the screen) . When working in automatic mode, the music was chosen from different directories in a random way - non-repeatable in the programming allowing to rotate styles throughout the day.
- Audicom 4 was the first version for Windows (Windows 3.x), but due to problems with the Win16 platform it was canceled in favor of the Win32 platform (Audicom 5). The change caused a delay to the project close to 2 years .
- Audicom 5 Presented at CAPER 1996: first commercial version on Windows. There were two versions: with ECAM boards and multimedia. The multimedia version included the option of an audio co-processor board manufactured by Solidyne, which by means of an audio compressor-expander increased the dynamic range of the sound cards of that time by providing balanced audio inputs and outputs. The new ECAM boards allowed for crossfade and audio mixing on the same board. Multimedia systems required two boards to perform these operations. It operated with a third audio card if it was desired to have PFL audio reproduction (Cue).
- Audicom 6 (2000): It worked with standard audio cards. It introduced a new DirectX-based play engine, allowing mixes to be performed on the same audio card. It was the first broadcasting system to support MP3 allowing crossfade between two MP3 files of different sampling rates and perform concurrent monitoring decoded by software.
- Audicom 7 (2002): included support for multiple users (permissions, attributions), transparent management of network terminals. It incorporates AutoEdit, a tool to automatically eliminate silences in MP3 files without having to transfer them to PCM and re-compress them.
