= Playout =

Generation and transmission of a television or radio signal

In broadcasting, channel playout is the generation of the source signal of a radio or television channel produced by a broadcaster, coupled with the transmission of this signal for primary distribution or direct-to-audience distribution via any network. Such radio or television distribution networks include terrestrial broadcasting (analogue or digital radio), cable networks, satellites (either for primary distribution intended for cable television headends or for direct reception, DTH / DBS), Internet Protocol television, OTT Video, point-to-point transport over managed networks or the public Internet, etc.

The television channel playout happens in master control room (MCR) in a playout area, which can be either situated in the central apparatus room or in purposely built playout centres, which can be owned by a broadcaster or run by an independent specialist company that has been contracted to handle the playout for a number of channels from different broadcasters.

Some of the larger playout centres in Europe, Southeast Asia and the United States handle well in excess of 50 radio and television "feeds". Feeds will often consist of several different versions of a core service, often different language versions or with separately scheduled content, such as local opt outs for news or promotions.

== Playout systems ==
Centralcasting is multi-channel playout that generally uses broadcast automation systems with broadcast programming applications. These systems generally work in a similar way, controlling video servers, video tape recorder (VTR) devices, Flexicarts, audio mixing consoles, vision mixers and video routers, and other devices using a serial communications 9-Pin Protocol (RS-232 or RS-422). This provides deterministic control, enabling frame accurate playback, Instant replay or video switching. Many systems consist of a front end operator interface on a separate platform to the controllers – e.g. a Windows GUI will present a friendly easy to use method of editing a playlist, but actual control would be done on a platform with a real-time operating system such that any large-scale playlist amendments do not cause delays to device control.

Most broadcast automation systems will have a series of common device drivers built in, for example Sony VTR control (aka Sony Serial), Louth Video Disk Control Protocol (VDCP, a proprietary communications protocol), General Purpose Interface (GPI), PlayBox Technology Channel in a Box, or Grass Valley Group M21 Master Control. This ensures that a broadcast automation system bought "off the shelf" will at least be able to ingest and playout content, although may not be able to take advantage of more efficient methods of control. Most server, and especially most digital on-screen graphic and character generator (CG) manufacturers will have a specific device driver for their device, with increasing degrees of complexity, and different automation companies will include these drivers to enhance their product or to fit a customer's need.

This is the "traditional" method of playout automation, where there are multiple devices. Some modern automation systems use a unified playout method, where the broadcast server fulfills the functions of multiple devices as a self-contained system, like the PlayBox Technology channel-in-a-box.

== Playout devices ==
Playout will usually involve an airchain of devices which begin with content, typically stored on video servers, and ultimately an output, either as an asynchronous serial interface (ASI), IP or serial digital interface (SDI) for on pass to a distribution company.

The devices in the chain depend on the service required under the contract with the Channel. Typically a standard television channel would require a Master Control, Video switcher, and/or a Video router to allow switching of live sources. This video switcher may include other functions such as keying (graphics) (also known as Down Stream Keyers), Audio Overs for mixing in voice overs (VO) or announcements, and facilitate transitions between events, such as a fade through black or crossfade (also known as mix).

Other devices include:

Graphics inserters – At least one Graphics inserter, or one with several layers. This allows for Station identification/Logo/Digital on-screen graphic (Dog or Bug) insertion, and can also be used for end credits sequences, coming next graphics or programme information straps

Subtitling inserters – This can be either closed or open – i.e. in vision as a graphic for all to see, or closed either as an MPEG stream item, Closed Captioning or World System Teletext.

Audio servers – An audio playout system would provide scheduled voiceovers

Aspect Ratio Converters – These alter the picture shape or send an embedded signal to allow the material format to be displayed correctly on a particular feed (e.g. Widescreen on a standard non-widescreen Analogue terrestrial feed)

Some of these more advanced devices require information from the playlist, and so do not tend to use an RS422/232 driver, but a complex XML based system which allows for more complex metadata to be passed, e.g. a "Now" or "Next" Graphic can be created from a template using text information from the playlist.

== Channel-in-a-box concept ==
With the "softwarization" of the various functions required to generate the channel signal in a playout system, the possibility to gather all of them into a single piece of equipment became possible. Such all-in-one video playout servers are known as channel-in-a-box systems.

== Playout Centers ==
Playout is one of the basic infrastructure of a playout center. Mostly called as channel in a box server, but basically composed of playout servers with integrated graphics and IP or ASI output. Aim of playout centers is mostly to serve customers a simple file based television facility. Up-link and TV Channel in a box servers simply provide the facility.

== Scheduling ==
The playout system execute a scheduled and time-accurate playlist of content to generate a linear radio or television signal (or "feed"). Within that playlist, there is the content that goes "on-air": live or recorded shows/programs, ad breaks, auto-promo clips, etc.

== Workflow ==
A common workflow is for the broadcast automation system to have a recording schedule to ingest material from a satellite or line feed source and then time-shift that material based on a playlist or schedule.

The playout schedule will have been created in the customer's broadcast programming scheduling system and exported into a format suitable to be used in the Playout system. There is a move to SMPTE-22, known as Broadcast Exchange Format (BXF) to try to standardise the messaging involved in this interaction.

The resulting playlist is "loaded" into the appropriate channel of the broadcast automation system in advance of the transmission time. Various processes will take place to ensure the content is available on the correct servers for playout at the right time, typically this involves advance requests to move material from deep storage such as Tape Archives or FTP Clusters to Broadcast Video servers, often using FTP.

On playing out the material, the audio and video signals are usually transported from the playout area to the network via a studio/transmitter link (STL), which may be fibre backlink, microwave or satellite uplink.

Playout is often referred to as Presentation or Transmission (TX), and is under control of an automatic transmission system.

== See also ==
- Broadcast
