= Broadcast automation =

Systems that can run a broadcast facility in the absence of a human operator

Broadcast automation incorporates the use of broadcast programming technology to automate broadcasting operations. Used either at a broadcast network, radio station or a television station, it can run a facility in the absence of a human operator. It can also run in a live assist mode when there are on-air personnel present at the master control, television studio or control room.

The radio transmitter end of the airchain is handled by a separate automatic transmission system (ATS).

== History ==
Originally, in the US, many (if not most) broadcast licensing authorities required a licensed board operator to run every station at all times, meaning that every DJ had to pass an exam to obtain a license to be on-air, if their duties also required them to ensure proper operation of the transmitter. This was often the case on overnight and weekend shifts when there was no broadcast engineer present, and all of the time for small stations with only a contract engineer on call.

In the U.S., it was also necessary to have an operator on duty at all times in case the Emergency Broadcast System (EBS) was used, as this had to be triggered manually. While there has not been a requirement to relay any other warnings, any mandatory messages from the U.S. president would have had to first be authenticated with a codeword sealed in a pink envelope sent annually to stations by the Federal Communications Commission (FCC).

Gradually, the quality and reliability of electronic equipment improved, regulations were relaxed, and no operator had to be present (or even available) while a station was operating. In the U.S., this came about when the EAS replaced the EBS, starting the movement toward automation to assist, and sometimes take the place of, the live disc jockeys (DJs) and radio personalities. In 1999, The Weather Channel launched Weatherscan Local, a cable television channel that broadcast uninterrupted live local weather information and forecasts. Weatherscan Local became Weatherscan in 2003 but was shut down in 2022.

== Early analog systems ==
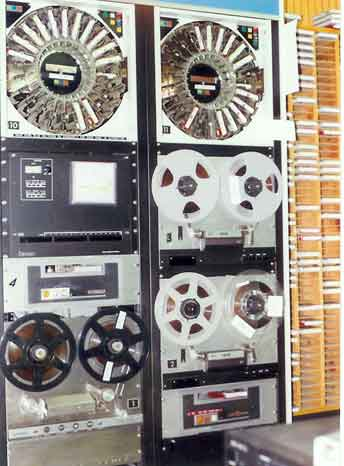
Harris automation system used at the former WWJQ (now WPNW) in 1993

Early automation systems were electromechanical systems which used relays. Later systems were "computerized" only to the point of maintaining a schedule, and were limited to radio rather than TV. Music would be stored on reel-to-reel audio tape. Subaudible tones on the tape marked the end of each song. The computer would simply rotate among the tape players until the computer's internal clock matched that of a scheduled event. When a scheduled event was encountered, the computer would finish the currently-playing song and then execute the scheduled block of events. These events were usually advertisements, but could also include the station's top-of-hour station identification, news, or a bumper promoting the station or its other shows. At the end of the block, the rotation among tapes resumed.

Advertisements, jingles, and the top-of-hour station identification required by law were commonly stored on Fidelipac endless-loop tape cartridges, known colloquially as "carts". These were similar to the consumer four-track tapes sold under the Stereo-Pak brand, but had only two tracks and were usually recorded and played at 7.5 tape inches per second (in/s) compared to Stereo-Pak's slower 3.75 in/s. The carts had a slot for a pinch roller on a spindle which was activated by solenoid upon pressing the start button on the cart machine. Because the capstan was already spinning at full speed, tape playback commenced without delay or any audible "run-up". Mechanical carousels would rotate the carts in and out of multiple tape players as dictated by the computer. Time announcements were provided by a pair of dedicated cart players, with the even minutes stored on one and the odd minutes on the other, meaning an announcement would always be ready to play even if the minute was changing when the announcement was triggered. The system did require attention throughout the day to change reels as they ran out and reload carts, and thus became obsolete when a method was developed to automatically rewind and re-cue the reel tapes when they ran out, extending 'walk-away' time indefinitely.

Radio station WIRX may have been one of the world's first completely automated radio stations, built and designed by Brian Jeffrey Brown in 1963 when Brown was only 10 years old. The station broadcast in a classical format, called "More Good Music (MGM)" and featured five-minute bottom-of-the-hour news feeds from the Mutual Broadcasting System. The heart of the automation was an 8 x 24 telephone stepping relay which controlled two reel-to-reel tape decks, one twelve-inch Ampex machine providing the main program audio and a second RCA seven inch machine providing "fill" music. The tapes played by these machines were originally produced in the Midwest Family Broadcasting (MWF) Madison, Wisconsin production facility by WSJM Chief Engineer Richard E. McLemore (and later in-house at WSJM) with sub-audible tones used to signal the end of a song. The stepping relay was programmed by slide switches in the front of the two relay racks which housed the equipment. The news feeds were triggered by a microswitch which was attached to a Western Union clock and tripped by the minute hand of the clock, then reset the stepping relay. Originally, 30-minute station identification was accomplished by a simulcast switch in the control booth for sister station WSJM, whereupon the disc jockey in the booth would announce "This is WSJM-AM and... (then pressing the momentary contact button) ...WSJM-FM, St. Joseph, Michigan." This only lasted about six months, however, and a standard tape cartridge player was wired in to announce the station identification and triggered by the Western Union clock.

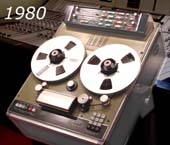
Solidyne GMS200 tape recorder with computer self-adjustment, Argentina (1980–1990)

A different technology appeared in 1980 with the analog recorders made by Solidyne, which used a computer-controlled tape positioning system. Four GMS 204 units were controlled from a 6809 microprocessor, with the program stored in a solid-state plug-in memory module. This system has a limited programming time of about eight hours.

Satellite programming often used audible dual-tone multi-frequency (DTMF) signals to trigger events at affiliate stations. This allowed the automatic local insertion of ads and station IDs. Because there are 12 (or 16) tone pairs, and typically four tones were sent in rapid succession (less than one second), more events could be triggered than by sub-audible tones (usually 25 and 35 Hz).

== Modern digital systems ==
Modern systems run on hard disk, where all of the music, jingles, advertisements, voice tracks, and other announcements are stored. These audio files may be either compressed or uncompressed, or often with only minimal compression as a compromise between file size and quality. For radio software, these disks are usually in computers, sometimes running their own custom operating systems, but more often running as an application on a PC operating system.

Scheduling was an important advance of these systems, allowing for exact timing. Some systems use GPS satellite receivers to obtain exact atomic time, for perfect synchronization with satellite-delivered programming. Reasonably accurate timekeeping can also be obtained with the use of Internet Protocols (IP) like Network Time Protocol (NTP).

Automation systems are also more interactive than ever before with digital audio workstation (DAW) with console automation and can even record from a telephone hybrid to play back an edited conversation with a telephone caller. This is part of a system's live-assist mode.

The use of automation software and voice tracks to replace live DJs is a current trend in radio broadcasting, done by many Internet radio and adult hits stations. Stations can even be voice-tracked from another city far away, now often delivering sound files over the Internet. In the U.S., this is a common practice under controversy for making radio more generic and artificial. Having local content is also touted as a way for traditional stations to compete with satellite radio, where there may be no radio personality on the air at all.

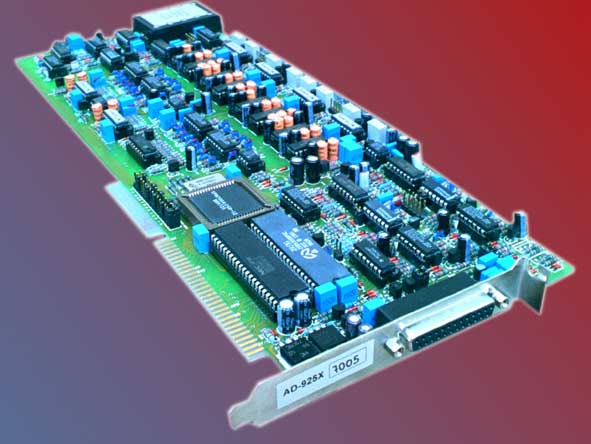
Solidyne 922, the first bit compression card for PC (1990)

A commercially available, for-sale product named Audicom was introduced by Oscar Bonello in 1989. It is based on psychoacoustic lossy compression, the same principle being used in most modern lossy audio encoders such as MP3 and Advanced Audio Coding (AAC), and it allowed both broadcast automation and recording to hard drives.

=== Television ===
In television, playout automation is also becoming more practical as the storage space of hard drives increases. Television shows and television commercials, as well as digital on-screen graphics (DOG or BUG), can all be stored on video servers remotely controlled by computers utilizing the 9-Pin Protocol and the Video Disk Control Protocol (VDCP). These systems can be very extensive, tied-in with parts that allow the "ingest" (as it is called in the industry) of video from satellite networks and electronic news gathering (ENG) operations and management of the video library, including archival of footage for later use. In ATSC, Programming Metadata Communication Protocol (PMCP) is then used to pass information about the video through the airchain to Program and System Information Protocol (PSIP), which transmits the current electronic program guide (EPG) information over digital television to the viewer.

== See also ==
- Audicom
- Centralcasting
- Community radio
- Emergency Alert System
- Fidelipac
- Local insertion
- Playout
- Radio software
- Station identification
