= Glossary of engineering: A–L =

This glossary of engineering terms is a list of definitions about the major concepts of engineering. Please see the bottom of the page for glossaries of specific fields of engineering.

== A ==
Absolute electrode potential
In electrochemistry, according to an IUPAC definition, is the electrode potential of a metal measured with respect to a universal reference system (without any additional metal–solution interface).
Absolute pressure
is zero-referenced against a perfect vacuum, using an absolute scale, so it is equal to gauge pressure plus atmospheric pressure.
Absolute zero
The lower limit of the thermodynamic temperature scale, a state at which the enthalpy and entropy of a cooled ideal gas reach their minimum value, taken as 0. Absolute zero is the point at which the fundamental particles of nature have minimal vibrational motion, retaining only quantum mechanical, zero-point energy-induced particle motion. The theoretical temperature is determined by extrapolating the ideal gas law; by international agreement, absolute zero is taken as −273.15° on the Celsius scale (International System of Units), which equals −459.67° on the Fahrenheit scale (United States customary units or Imperial units). The corresponding Kelvin and Rankine temperature scales set their zero points at absolute zero by definition.
Absorbance
Absorbance or decadic absorbance is the common logarithm of the ratio of incident to transmitted radiant power through a material, and spectral absorbance or spectral decadic absorbance is the common logarithm of the ratio of incident to transmitted spectral radiant power through a material.
AC power
Electric power delivered by alternating current; common household power is AC.
Acceleration
The rate at which the velocity of a body changes with time, and the direction in which that change is acting.
Acid
A molecule or ion capable of donating a hydron (proton or hydrogen ion H^{+}), or, alternatively, capable of forming a covalent bond with an electron pair (a Lewis acid).
Acid–base reaction
A chemical reaction that occurs between an acid and a base, which can be used to determine pH.
Acid strength
In strong acids, most of the molecules give up a hydrogen ion and become ionized.
Acoustics
The scientific study of sound.
Activated sludge
A type of wastewater treatment process for treating sewage or industrial wastewaters using aeration and a biological floc composed of bacteria and protozoa.
Activated sludge model
A generic name for a group of mathematical methods to model activated sludge systems.
Active transport
In cellular biology, active transport is the movement of molecules across a membrane from a region of their lower concentration to a region of their higher concentration—against the concentration gradient. Active transport requires cellular energy to achieve this movement. There are two types of active transport: primary active transport that uses ATP, and secondary active transport that uses an electrochemical gradient. An example of active transport in human physiology is the uptake of glucose in the intestines.
Actuator
A device that accepts 2 inputs (control signal, energy source) and outputs kinetic energy in the form of physical movement (linear, rotary, or oscillatory). The control signal input specifies which motion should be taken. The energy source input is typically either an electric current, hydraulic pressure, or pneumatic pressure. An actuator can be the final element of a control loop
Adenosine triphosphate
A complex organic chemical that provides energy to drive many processes in living cells, e.g. muscle contraction, nerve impulse propagation, chemical synthesis. Found in all forms of life, ATP is often referred to as the "molecular unit of currency" of intracellular energy transfer.
Adhesion
The tendency of dissimilar particles or surfaces to cling to one another (cohesion refers to the tendency of similar or identical particles/surfaces to cling to one another).
Adiabatic process
A process where no heat energy is lost to outside space.
Adiabatic wall
A barrier through which heat energy cannot pass.
Aerobic digestion
A process in sewage treatment designed to reduce the volume of sewage sludge and make it suitable for subsequent use.
Aerodynamics
The study of the motion of air, particularly its interaction with a solid object, such as an airplane wing. It is a sub-field of fluid dynamics and gas dynamics, and many aspects of aerodynamics theory are common to these fields.
Aerospace engineering
is the primary field of engineering concerned with the development of aircraft and spacecraft. It has two major and overlapping branches: Aeronautical engineering and Astronautical Engineering. Avionics engineering is similar, but deals with the electronics side of aerospace engineering.
Afocal system
An optical system that produces no net convergence or divergence of the beam, i.e. has an infinite effective focal length.
Agricultural engineering
The profession of designing machinery, processes, and systems for use in agriculture.
Albedo
A measure of the fraction of light reflected from an astronomical body or other object.
Alkane
An alkane, or paraffin (a historical name that also has other meanings), is an acyclic saturated hydrocarbon. In other words, an alkane consists of hydrogen and carbon atoms arranged in a tree structure in which all the carbon–carbon bonds are single.
Alkene
An unsaturated hydrocarbon that contains at least one carbon–carbon double bond. The words alkene and olefin are often used interchangeably.
Alkyne
is an unsaturated hydrocarbon containing at least one carbon—carbon triple bond. The simplest acyclic alkynes with only one triple bond and no other functional groups form a homologous series with the general chemical formula C_{n}H_{2n−2}.
Alloy
is a combination of metals or of a metal and another element. Alloys are defined by a metallic bonding character.
Alpha particle
Alpha particles consist of two protons and two neutrons bound together into a particle identical to a helium-4 nucleus. They are generally produced in the process of alpha decay, but may also be produced in other ways. Alpha particles are named after the first letter in the Greek alphabet, α.
Alternating current
Electrical current that regularly reverses direction.
Alternative hypothesis
In statistical hypothesis testing, the alternative hypothesis (or maintained hypothesis or research hypothesis) and the null hypothesis are the two rival hypotheses which are compared by a statistical hypothesis test. In the domain of science two rival hypotheses can be compared by explanatory power and predictive power.
Ammeter
An instrument that measures current.
Amino acids
are organic compounds containing amine (–NH_{2}) and carboxyl (–COOH) functional groups, along with a side chain (R group) specific to each amino acid. The key elements of an amino acid are carbon (C), hydrogen (H), oxygen (O), and nitrogen (N), although other elements are found in the side chains of certain amino acids. About 500 naturally occurring amino acids are known (though only 20 appear in the genetic code) and can be classified in many ways.
Amorphous solid
An amorphous (from the Greek a, without, morphé, shape, form) or non-crystalline solid is a solid that lacks the long-range order that is characteristic of a crystal.
Ampere
The SI unit of current flow, one coulomb per second.
Amphoterism
In chemistry, an amphoteric compound is a molecule or ion that can react both as an acid as well as a base. Many metals (such as copper, zinc, tin, lead, aluminium, and beryllium) form amphoteric oxides or hydroxides. Amphoterism depends on the oxidation states of the oxide. Al_{2}O_{3} is an example of an amphoteric oxide.
Amplifier
A device that replicates a signal with increased power.
Amplitude
The amplitude of a periodic variable is a measure of its change over a single period (such as time or spatial period). There are various definitions of amplitude, which are all functions of the magnitude of the difference between the variable's extreme values. In older texts the phase is sometimes called the amplitude.
Anaerobic digestion
is a collection of processes by which microorganisms break down biodegradable material in the absence of oxygen. The process is used for industrial or domestic purposes to manage waste or to produce fuels. Much of the fermentation used industrially to produce food and drink products, as well as home fermentation, uses anaerobic digestion.
Angular acceleration
is the rate of change of angular velocity. In three dimensions, it is a pseudovector. In SI units, it is measured in radians per second squared (rad/s^{2}), and is usually denoted by the Greek letter alpha (α).
Angular momentum
In physics, angular momentum (rarely, moment of momentum or rotational momentum) is the rotational equivalent of linear momentum. It is an important quantity in physics because it is a conserved quantity—the total angular momentum of a system remains constant unless acted on by an external torque.
Angular velocity
In physics, the angular velocity of a particle is the rate at which it rotates around a chosen center point: that is, the time rate of change of its angular displacement relative to the origin (i.e. in layman's terms: how quickly an object goes around something over a period of time - e.g. how fast the earth orbits the sun). It is measured in angle per unit time, radians per second in SI units, and is usually represented by the symbol omega (ω, sometimes Ω). By convention, positive angular velocity indicates counter-clockwise rotation, while negative is clockwise.
Anion
is an ion with more electrons than protons, giving it a net negative charge (since electrons are negatively charged and protons are positively charged).
Annealing (metallurgy)
A heat treatment process that relieves internal stresses.
Annihilation
In particle physics, annihilation is the process that occurs when a subatomic particle collides with its respective antiparticle to produce other particles, such as an electron colliding with a positron to produce two photons. The total energy and momentum of the initial pair are conserved in the process and distributed among a set of other particles in the final state. Antiparticles have exactly opposite additive quantum numbers from particles, so the sums of all quantum numbers of such an original pair are zero. Hence, any set of particles may be produced whose total quantum numbers are also zero as long as conservation of energy and conservation of momentum are obeyed.
Anode
The electrode at which current enters a device such as an electrochemical cell or vacuum tube.
ANSI
The American National Standards Institute is a private non-profit organization that oversees the development of voluntary consensus standards for products, services, processes, systems, and personnel in the United States. The organization also coordinates U.S. standards with international standards so that American products can be used worldwide.
Anti-gravity
Anti-gravity (also known as non-gravitational field) is a theory of creating a place or object that is free from the force of gravity. It does not refer to the lack of weight under gravity experienced in free fall or orbit, or to balancing the force of gravity with some other force, such as electromagnetism or aerodynamic lift.
Applied engineering
is the field concerned with the application of management, design, and technical skills for the design and integration of systems, the execution of new product designs, the improvement of manufacturing processes, and the management and direction of physical and/or technical functions of a firm or organization. Applied-engineering degreed programs typically include instruction in basic engineering principles, project management, industrial processes, production and operations management, systems integration and control, quality control, and statistics.
Applied mathematics
Mathematics used for solutions of practical problems, as opposed to pure mathematics.
Arc length
Arc length is the distance between two points along a section of a curve. Determining the length of an irregular arc segment is also called rectification of a curve. The advent of infinitesimal calculus led to a general formula that provides closed-form solutions in some cases.
Archimedes' principle
states that the upward buoyant force that is exerted on a body immersed in a fluid, whether fully or partially submerged, is equal to the weight of the fluid that the body displaces and acts in the upward direction at the center of mass of the displaced fluid. Archimedes' principle is a law of physics fundamental to fluid mechanics. It was formulated by Archimedes of Syracuse
Area moment of inertia
The 2nd moment of area, also known as moment of inertia of plane area, area moment of inertia, or second area moment, is a geometrical property of an area which reflects how its points are distributed with regard to an arbitrary axis. The second moment of area is typically denoted with either an $I$ for an axis that lies in the plane or with a $J$ for an axis perpendicular to the plane. In both cases, it is calculated with a multiple integral over the object in question. Its dimension is L (length) to the fourth power. Its unit of dimension when working with the International System of Units is meters to the fourth power, m^{4}.
Arithmetic mean
In mathematics and statistics, the arithmetic mean or simply the mean or average when the context is clear, is the sum of a collection of numbers divided by the number of numbers in the collection.
Arithmetic progression
In mathematics, an arithmetic progression (AP) or arithmetic sequence is a sequence of numbers such that the difference between the consecutive terms is constant. Difference here means the second minus the first. For instance, the sequence 5, 7, 9, 11, 13, 15, . . . is an arithmetic progression with common difference of 2.
Aromatic hydrocarbon
An aromatic hydrocarbon or arene (or sometimes aryl hydrocarbon) is a hydrocarbon with sigma bonds and delocalized pi electrons between carbon atoms forming a circle. In contrast, aliphatic hydrocarbons lack this delocalization. The term aromatic was assigned before the physical mechanism determining aromaticity was discovered; the term was coined as such simply because many of the compounds have a sweet or pleasant odour. The configuration of six carbon atoms in aromatic compounds is known as a benzene ring, after the simplest possible such hydrocarbon, benzene. Aromatic hydrocarbons can be monocyclic (MAH) or polycyclic (PAH).
Arrhenius equation
The Arrhenius equation is a formula for the temperature dependence of reaction rates. The equation was proposed by Svante Arrhenius in 1889, based on the work of Dutch chemist Jacobus Henricus van 't Hoff who had noted in 1884 that Van 't Hoff's equation for the temperature dependence of equilibrium constants suggests such a formula for the rates of both forward and reverse reactions. This equation has a vast and important application in determining rate of chemical reactions and for calculation of energy of activation. Arrhenius provided a physical justification and interpretation for the formula. Currently, it is best seen as an empirical relationship. It can be used to model the temperature variation of diffusion coefficients, population of crystal vacancies, creep rates, and many other thermally-induced processes/reactions. The Eyring equation, developed in 1935, also expresses the relationship between rate and energy.
Artificial intelligence
(AI), is intelligence demonstrated by machines, unlike the natural intelligence displayed by humans and animals. Leading AI textbooks define the field as the study of "intelligent agents": any device that perceives its environment and takes actions that maximize its chance of successfully achieving its goals. Colloquially, the term "artificial intelligence" is often used to describe machines (or computers) that mimic "cognitive" functions that humans associate with the human mind, such as "learning" and "problem solving".
Assembly language
A computer programming language where most statements correspond to one or a few machine op-codes.
Atomic orbital
In atomic theory and quantum mechanics, an atomic orbital is a mathematical function that describes the wave-like behavior of either one electron or a pair of electrons in an atom. This function can be used to calculate the probability of finding any electron of an atom in any specific region around the atom's nucleus. The term atomic orbital may also refer to the physical region or space where the electron can be calculated to be present, as defined by the particular mathematical form of the orbital.
Atomic packing factor
The percentage of the volume filled with atomic mass in a crystal formation.
Audio frequency
An audio frequency (abbreviation: AF), or audible frequency is characterized as a periodic vibration whose frequency is audible to the average human. The SI unit of audio frequency is the hertz (Hz). It is the property of sound that most determines pitch.
Austenitization
Austenitization means to heat iron, iron-based metal, or steel to a temperature at which it changes crystal structure from ferrite to austenite. The more open structure of the austenite is then able to absorb carbon from the iron-carbides in carbon steel. An incomplete initial austenitization can leave undissolved carbides in the matrix. For some irons, iron-based metals, and steels, the presence of carbides may occur during the austenitization step. The term commonly used for this is two-phase austenitization.
Automation
is the technology by which a process or procedure is performed with minimum human assistance. Automation or automatic control is the use of various control systems for operating equipment such as machinery, processes in factories, boilers, and heat-treating ovens, switching on telephone networks, steering and stabilization of ships, aircraft and other applications and vehicles with minimal or reduced human intervention. Some processes have been completely automated.
Autonomous vehicle
A vehicle capable of driving from one point to another without input from a human operator.
Azimuthal quantum number
The azimuthal quantum number is a quantum number for an atomic orbital that determines its orbital angular momentum and describes the shape of the orbital. The azimuthal quantum number is the second of a set of quantum numbers which describe the unique quantum state of an electron (the others being the principal quantum number, following spectroscopic notation, the magnetic quantum number, and the spin quantum number). It is also known as the orbital angular momentum quantum number, orbital quantum number or second quantum number, and is symbolized as ℓ.

== B ==
Barometer
A device for measuring pressure.
Battery
Electrochemical cells that transform chemical energy into electricity.
Base
In chemistry, bases are substances that, in aqueous solution, release hydroxide (OH^{−}) ions, are slippery to the touch, can taste bitter if an alkali, change the color of indicators (e.g., turn red litmus paper blue), react with acids to form salts, promote certain chemical reactions (base catalysis), accept protons from any proton donor, and/or contain completely or partially displaceable OH^{−} ions.
Baud
Rate at which data is transferred in symbols/second; a symbol may represent one or more bits.
Beam
A structural element whose length is significantly greater than its width or height.
Beer–Lambert law
The Beer–Lambert law, also known as Beer's law, the Lambert–Beer law, or the Beer–Lambert–Bouguer law relates the attenuation of light to the properties of the material through which the light is travelling. The law is commonly applied to chemical analysis measurements and used in understanding attenuation in physical optics, for photons, neutrons, or rarefied gases. In mathematical physics, this law arises as a solution of the BGK equation.
Belt
A closed loop of flexible material used to transmit mechanical power from one pulley to another.
Belt friction
Describes the friction forces between a belt and a surface, such as a belt wrapped around a bollard. When one end of the belt is being pulled only part of this force is transmitted to the other end wrapped about a surface. The friction force increases with the amount of wrap about a surface and makes it so the tension in the belt can be different at both ends of the belt. Belt friction can be modeled by the Belt friction equation.
Bending
In applied mechanics, bending (also known as flexure) characterizes the behavior of a slender structural element subjected to an external load applied perpendicularly to a longitudinal axis of the element. The structural element is assumed to be such that at least one of its dimensions is a small fraction, typically 1/10 or less, of the other two.
Bending moment
In solid mechanics, a bending moment is the reaction induced in a structural element when an external force or moment is applied to the element, causing the element to bend. The most common or simplest structural element subjected to bending moments is the beam.
Benefit–cost analysis
Cost–benefit analysis (CBA), sometimes called benefit costs analysis (BCA), is a systematic approach to estimating the strengths and weaknesses of alternatives (for example in transactions, activities, functional business requirements); it is used to determine options that provide the best approach to achieve benefits while preserving savings. It may be used to compare potential (or completed) courses of actions; or estimate (or evaluate) the value against costs of a single decision, project, or policy.
Bernoulli differential equation
In mathematics, an ordinary differential equation of the form:

$$y'+ P(x)y=Q(x)y^n\,$$

is called a Bernoulli differential equation where $n$ is any real number and $n \ne 0$ and $n \ne 1$. It is named after Jacob Bernoulli who discussed it in 1695. Bernoulli equations are special because they are nonlinear differential equations with known exact solutions. A famous special case of the Bernoulli equation is the logistic differential equation.
Bernoulli's equation
An equation for relating several measurements within a fluid flow, such as velocity, pressure, and potential energy.
Bernoulli's principle
In fluid dynamics, Bernoulli's principle states that an increase in the speed of a fluid occurs simultaneously with a decrease in pressure or a decrease in the fluid's potential energy. The principle is named after Daniel Bernoulli who published it in his book Hydrodynamica in 1738. Although Bernoulli deduced that pressure decreases when the flow speed increases, it was Leonhard Euler who derived Bernoulli's equation in its usual form in 1752. The principle is only applicable for isentropic flows: when the effects of irreversible processes (like turbulence) and non-adiabatic processes (e.g. heat radiation) are small and can be neglected.
Beta particle
also called beta ray or beta radiation (symbol β), is a high-energy, high-speed electron or positron emitted by the radioactive decay of an atomic nucleus during the process of beta decay. There are two forms of beta decay, β^{−} decay and β^{+} decay, which produce electrons and positrons respectively.
Binomial distribution
In probability theory and statistics, the binomial distribution with parameters n and p is the discrete probability distribution of the number of successes in a sequence of n independent experiments, each asking a yes–no question, and each with its own boolean-valued outcome: a random variable containing a single bit of information: success/yes/true/one (with probability p) or failure/no/false/zero (with probability q=1 − p). A single success-failure experiment is also called a Bernoulli trial or Bernoulli experiment and a sequence of outcomes is called a Bernoulli process; for a single trial, i.e., n=1, the binomial distribution is a Bernoulli distribution. The binomial distribution is the basis for the popular binomial test of statistical significance.
Biocatalysis
Biocatalysis refers to the use of living (biological) systems or their parts to speed up (catalyze) chemical reactions. In biocatalytic processes, natural catalysts, such as enzymes, perform chemical transformations on organic compounds. Both enzymes that have been more or less isolated and enzymes still residing inside living cells are employed for this task. The modern usage of biotechnologically produced and possibly modified enzymes for organic synthesis is termed chemoenzymatic synthesis; the reactions performed are chemoenzymatic reactions.
Biomedical engineering
Biomedical engineering (BME) or medical engineering is the application of engineering principles and design concepts to medicine and biology for healthcare purposes (e.g. diagnostic or therapeutic). This field seeks to close the gap between engineering and medicine, combining the design and problem solving skills of engineering with medical biological sciences to advance health care treatment, including diagnosis, monitoring, and therapy.
Biomimetic
Biomimetics or biomimicry is the imitation of the models, systems, and elements of nature for the purpose of solving complex human problems.
Bionics
The application of biological methods to engineering systems.
Biophysics
is an interdisciplinary science that applies approaches and methods traditionally used in physics to study biological phenomena. Biophysics covers all scales of biological organization, from molecular to organismic and populations. Biophysical research shares significant overlap with biochemistry, molecular biology, physical chemistry, physiology, nanotechnology, bioengineering, computational biology, biomechanics and systems biology.
Biot number
The Biot number (Bi) is a dimensionless quantity used in heat transfer calculations. It is named after the eighteenth century French physicist Jean-Baptiste Biot (1774–1862), and gives a simple index of the ratio of the heat transfer resistances inside of and at the surface of a body. This ratio determines whether or not the temperatures inside a body will vary significantly in space, while the body heats or cools over time, from a thermal gradient applied to its surface.
Block and tackle
A system of pulleys and a rope threaded between them, used to lift or pull heavy loads.
Body force
is a force that acts throughout the volume of a body. Forces due to gravity, electric fields and magnetic fields are examples of body forces. Body forces contrast with contact forces or surface forces which are exerted to the surface of an object.
Boiler
is a closed vessel in which fluid (generally water) is heated. The fluid does not necessarily boil. The heated or vaporized fluid exits the boiler for use in various processes or heating applications, including water heating, central heating, boiler-based power generation, cooking, and sanitation.
Boiling point
The boiling point of a substance is the temperature at which the vapor pressure of a liquid equals the pressure surrounding the liquid and the liquid changes into a vapor.
Boiling-point elevation
Boiling-point elevation describes the phenomenon that the boiling point of a liquid (a solvent) will be higher when another compound is added, meaning that a solution has a higher boiling point than a pure solvent. This happens whenever a non-volatile solute, such as a salt, is added to a pure solvent, such as water. The boiling point can be measured accurately using an ebullioscope.
Boltzmann constant
The Boltzmann constant (k_{B} or k) is a physical constant relating the average kinetic energy of particles in a gas with the temperature of the gas and occurs in Planck's law of black-body radiation and in Boltzmann's entropy formula. It was introduced by Max Planck, but named after Ludwig Boltzmann. It is the gas constant R divided by the Avogadro constant N_{A}:

$$k=\frac{R}{N_\text{A}} .$$.

Boson
In quantum mechanics, a boson (/ˈboʊsɒn/, /ˈboʊzɒn/) is a particle that follows Bose–Einstein statistics. Bosons make up one of the two classes of particles, the other being fermions. The name boson was coined by Paul Dirac to commemorate the contribution of Indian physicist and professor of physics at University of Calcutta and at University of Dhaka, Satyendra Nath Bose in developing, with Albert Einstein, Bose–Einstein statistics—which theorizes the characteristics of elementary particles.
Boyle's law
Boyle's law (sometimes referred to as the Boyle–Mariotte law, or Mariotte's law) is an experimental gas law that describes how the pressure of a gas tends to increase as the volume of the container decreases. A modern statement of Boyle's law is: The absolute pressure exerted by a given mass of an ideal gas is inversely proportional to the volume it occupies if the temperature and amount of gas remain unchanged within a closed system.
Bravais lattice
In geometry and crystallography, a Bravais lattice, named after Auguste Bravais (1850), is an infinite array (or a finite array, if we consider the edges, obviously) of discrete points generated by a set of discrete translation operations described in three dimensional space by:

$$\mathbf{R}=n_{1}\mathbf{a}_{1} + n_{2}\mathbf{a}_{2} + n_{3}\mathbf{a}_{3}$$

where n_{i} are any integers and a_{i} are known as the primitive vectors which lie in different directions (not necessarily mutually perpendicular) and span the lattice. This discrete set of vectors must be closed under vector addition and subtraction. For any choice of position vector R, the lattice looks exactly the same.
Brayton cycle
A thermodynamic cycle model for an ideal heat engine, in which heat is added or removed at constant pressure; approximated by a gas turbine.
Break-even
The break-even point (BEP) in economics, business—and specifically cost accounting—is the point at which total cost and total revenue are equal, i.e. "even". There is no net loss or gain, and one has "broken even", though opportunity costs have been paid and capital has received the risk-adjusted, expected return. In short, all costs that must be paid are paid, and there is neither profit nor loss.
Brewster's angle
Brewster's angle (also known as the polarization angle) is an angle of incidence at which light with a particular polarization is perfectly transmitted through a transparent dielectric surface, with no reflection. When unpolarized light is incident at this angle, the light that is reflected from the surface is therefore perfectly polarized. This special angle of incidence is named after the Scottish physicist Sir David Brewster (1781–1868).
Brittleness
A material is brittle if, when subjected to stress, it breaks without significant plastic deformation. Brittle materials absorb relatively little energy prior to fracture, even those of high strength. Breaking is often accompanied by a snapping sound. Brittle materials include most ceramics and glasses (which do not deform plastically) and some polymers, such as PMMA and polystyrene. Many steels become brittle at low temperatures (see ductile–brittle transition temperature), depending on their composition and processing.
Bromide
Any chemical substance made up of bromine, along with other elements.
Brønsted–Lowry acid–base theory
is an acid–base reaction theory which was proposed independently by Johannes Nicolaus Brønsted and Thomas Martin Lowry in 1923. The fundamental concept of this theory is that when an acid and a base react with each other, the acid forms its conjugate base, and the base forms its conjugate acid by exchange of a proton (the hydrogen cation, or H^{+}). This theory is a generalization of the Arrhenius theory.
Brownian motion
Brownian motion, or pedesis, is the random motion of particles suspended in a fluid (a liquid or a gas) resulting from their collision with the fast-moving molecules in the fluid.
Buckingham π theorem
A method for determining Π groups, or dimensionless descriptors of physical phenomena.
Buffer solution
A buffer solution (more precisely, pH buffer or hydrogen ion buffer) is an aqueous solution consisting of a mixture of a weak acid and its conjugate base, or vice versa. Its pH changes very little when a small amount of strong acid or base is added to it. Buffer solutions are used as a means of keeping pH at a nearly constant value in a wide variety of chemical applications. In nature, there are many systems that use buffering for pH regulation.
Bulk modulus
The bulk modulus ($K$ or $B$) of a substance is a measure of how resistant to compression that substance is. It is defined as the ratio of the infinitesimal pressure increase to the resulting relative decrease of the volume. Other moduli describe the material's response (strain) to other kinds of stress: the shear modulus describes the response to shear, and Young's modulus describes the response to linear stress. For a fluid, only the bulk modulus is meaningful. For a complex anisotropic solid such as wood or paper, these three moduli do not contain enough information to describe its behaviour, and one must use the full generalized Hooke's law.
Buoyancy
A force caused by displacement in a fluid by an object of different density than the fluid.

== C ==
Calculus
The mathematics of change.
Capacitance
The ability of a body to store electrical charge.
Capacitive reactance
The impedance of a capacitor in an alternating current circuit, the opposition to current flow.
Capacitor
An electrical component that stores energy in an electric field.
Capillary action
Capillary action (sometimes capillarity, capillary motion, capillary effect, or wicking) is the ability of a liquid to flow in narrow spaces without the assistance of, or even in opposition to, external forces like gravity. The effect can be seen in the drawing up of liquids between the hairs of a paintbrush, in a thin tube, in porous materials such as paper and plaster, in some non-porous materials such as sand and liquefied carbon fiber, or in a cell. It occurs because of intermolecular forces between the liquid and surrounding solid surfaces. If the diameter of the tube is sufficiently small, then the combination of surface tension (which is caused by cohesion within the liquid) and adhesive forces between the liquid and container wall act to propel the liquid.
Carbonate
Any mineral with bound carbon dioxide.
Carnot cycle
A hypothetical thermodynamic cycle for a heat engine; no thermodynamic cycle can be more efficient than a Carnot cycle operating between the same two temperature limits.
Cartesian coordinates
Coordinates within a rectangular Cartesian plane.
Castigliano's method
Named for Carlo Alberto Castigliano, is a method for determining the displacements of a linear-elastic system based on the partial derivatives of the energy. He is known for his two theorems. The basic concept is that a change in energy is equal to the causing force times the resulting displacement. Therefore, the causing force is equal to the change in energy divided by the resulting displacement. Alternatively, the resulting displacement is equal to the change in energy divided by the causing force. Partial derivatives are needed to relate causing forces and resulting displacements to the change in energy.
Casting
Forming of an object by pouring molten metal (or other substances) into a mold.
Cathode
The terminal of a device by which current exits.
Cathode ray
The stream of electrons emitted from a heated negative electrode and attracted to a positive electrode.
Cell membrane
The cell membrane (also known as the plasma membrane or cytoplasmic membrane, and historically referred to as the plasmalemma) is a biological membrane that separates the interior of all cells from the outside environment (the extracellular space) which protects the cell from its environment consisting of a lipid bilayer with embedded proteins.
Cell nucleus
In cell biology, the nucleus (pl. nuclei; from Latin nucleus or nuculeus, meaning 'kernel' or 'seed') is a membrane-enclosed organelle found in eukaryotic cells. Eukaryotes usually have a single nucleus, but a few cell types, such as mammalian red blood cells, have no nuclei, and a few others including osteoclasts have many.
Cell theory
In biology, cell theory is the historic scientific theory, now universally accepted, that living organisms are made up of cells, that they are the basic structural/organizational unit of all organisms, and that all cells come from pre-existing cells. Cells are the basic unit of structure in all organisms and also the basic unit of reproduction.
Center of gravity
The center of mass of an object, its balance point.
Center of mass
The weighted center of an object; a force applied through the center of mass will not cause rotation of the object.
Center of pressure
is the point where the total sum of a pressure field acts on a body, causing a force to act through that point. The total force vector acting at the center of pressure is the value of the integrated vectorial pressure field. The resultant force and center of pressure location produce equivalent force and moment on the body as the original pressure field.
Central force motion
.
Central limit theorem
In probability theory, the central limit theorem (CLT) establishes that, in some situations, when independent random variables are added, their properly normalized sum tends toward a normal distribution (informally a bell curve) even if the original variables themselves are not normally distributed. The theorem is a key concept in probability theory because it implies that probabilistic and statistical methods that work for normal distributions can be applicable to many problems involving other types of distributions.
Central processing unit
A central processing unit (CPU) is the electronic circuitry within a computer that carries out the instructions of a computer program by performing the basic arithmetic, logic, controlling and input/output (I/O) operations specified by the instructions. The computer industry has used the term central processing unit at least since the early 1960s. Traditionally, the term CPU refers to a processor, more specifically to its processing unit and control unit (CU), distinguishing these core elements of a computer from external components such as main memory and I/O circuitry.
Centripetal acceleration
.
Centripetal force
A force acting against rotational acceleration.
Centroid
The average point of volume for an object.
Centrosome
In cell biology, the centrosome is an organelle that serves as the main microtubule organizing center (MTOC) of the animal cell as well as a regulator of cell-cycle progression. The centrosome is thought to have evolved only in the metazoan lineage of eukaryotic cells. Fungi and plants lack centrosomes and therefore use structures other than MTOCs to organize their microtubules.
Chain reaction
is a sequence of reactions where a reactive product or by-product causes additional reactions to take place. In a chain reaction, positive feedback leads to a self-amplifying chain of events.
Change of base rule
.
Charles's law
Charles's law (also known as the law of volumes) is an experimental gas law that describes how gases tend to expand when heated. A modern statement of Charles's law is: When the pressure on a sample of a dry gas is held constant, the Kelvin temperature and the volume will be in direct proportion.
Chemical bond
is a lasting attraction between atoms, ions or molecules that enables the formation of chemical compounds. The bond may result from the electrostatic force of attraction between oppositely charged ions as in ionic bonds or through the sharing of electrons as in covalent bonds. The strength of chemical bonds varies considerably; there are "strong bonds" or "primary bonds" such as covalent, ionic and metallic bonds, and "weak bonds" or "secondary bonds" such as dipole–dipole interactions, the London dispersion force and hydrogen bonding.
Chemical compound
is a chemical substance composed of many identical molecules (or molecular entities) composed of atoms from more than one element held together by chemical bonds. A chemical element bonded to an identical chemical element is not a chemical compound since only one element, not two different elements, is involved.
Chemical equilibrium
In a chemical reaction, chemical equilibrium is the state in which both reactants and products are present in concentrations which have no further tendency to change with time, so that there is no observable change in the properties of the system. Usually, this state results when the forward reaction proceeds at the same rate as the reverse reaction. The reaction rates of the forward and backward reactions are generally not zero, but equal. Thus, there are no net changes in the concentrations of the reactants and products. Such a state is known as dynamic equilibrium.
Chemical kinetics
Chemical kinetics, also known as reaction kinetics, is the study of rates of chemical processes. Chemical kinetics includes investigations of how different experimental conditions can influence the speed of a chemical reaction and yield information about the reaction's mechanism and transition states, as well as the construction of mathematical models that can describe the characteristics of a chemical reaction.
Chemical reaction
A chemical reaction is a process that leads to the chemical transformation of one set of chemical substances to another. Classically, chemical reactions encompass changes that only involve the positions of electrons in the forming and breaking of chemical bonds between atoms, with no change to the nuclei (no change to the elements present), and can often be described by a chemical equation. Nuclear chemistry is a sub-discipline of chemistry that involves the chemical reactions of unstable and radioactive elements where both electronic and nuclear changes can occur.
Chemistry
is the scientific discipline involved with elements and compounds composed of atoms, molecules and ions: their composition, structure, properties, behavior and the changes they undergo during a reaction with other substances.
Chloride
Any chemical compound containing the element chlorine.
Chromate
Chromate salts contain the chromate anion, CrO^{2−}_{4}. Dichromate salts contain the dichromate anion, Cr_{2}O^{2−}_{7}. They are oxyanions of chromium in the 6+ oxidation state . They are moderately strong oxidizing agents. In an aqueous solution, chromate and dichromate ions can be interconvertible.
Circular motion
In physics, circular motion is a movement of an object along the circumference of a circle or rotation along a circular path. It can be uniform, with constant angular rate of rotation and constant speed, or non-uniform with a changing rate of rotation. The rotation around a fixed axis of a three-dimensional body involves circular motion of its parts. The equations of motion describe the movement of the center of mass of a body.
Civil engineering
The profession that deals with the design and construction of structures, or other fixed works.
Clausius–Clapeyron relation
The Clausius–Clapeyron relation, named after Rudolf Clausius and Benoît Paul Émile Clapeyron, is a way of characterizing a discontinuous phase transition between two phases of matter of a single constituent. On a pressure–temperature (P–T) diagram, the line separating the two phases is known as the coexistence curve. The Clausius–Clapeyron relation gives the slope of the tangents to this curve. Mathematically,

$$\frac{\mathrm{d}P}{\mathrm{d}T}=\frac{L}{T\,\Delta v}=\frac{\Delta s}{\Delta v},$$

where $\mathrm{d}P/\mathrm{d}T$ is the slope of the tangent to the coexistence curve at any point, $L$ is the specific latent heat, $T$ is the temperature, $\Delta v$ is the specific volume change of the phase transition, and $\Delta s$ is the specific entropy change of the phase transition.
Clausius inequality
.
Clausius theorem
The Clausius theorem (1855) states that a system exchanging heat with external reservoirs and undergoing a cyclic process, is one that ultimately returns a system to its original state,

$$\oint \frac{\delta Q}{T_{surr}} \leq 0,$$

where $\delta Q$ is the infinitesimal amount of heat absorbed by the system from the reservoir and $T_{surr}$ is the temperature of the external reservoir (surroundings) at a particular instant in time. In the special case of a reversible process, the equality holds. The reversible case is used to introduce the entropy state function. This is because in a cyclic process the variation of a state function is zero. In words, the Clausius statement states that it is impossible to construct a device whose sole effect is the transfer of heat from a cool reservoir to a hot reservoir. Equivalently, heat spontaneously flows from a hot body to a cooler one, not the other way around. The generalized "inequality of Clausius"

$$dS > \frac{\delta Q}{T_{surr}}$$

for an infinitesimal change in entropy S applies not only to cyclic processes, but to any process that occurs in a closed system.
Coefficient of performance
The coefficient of performance or COP (sometimes CP or CoP) of a heat pump, refrigerator or air conditioning system is a ratio of useful heating or cooling provided to work required. Higher COPs equate to lower operating costs. The COP usually exceeds 1, especially in heat pumps, because, instead of just converting work to heat (which, if 100% efficient, would be a COP_hp of 1), it pumps additional heat from a heat source to where the heat is required. For complete systems, COP calculations should include energy consumption of all power consuming auxiliaries. COP is highly dependent on operating conditions, especially absolute temperature and relative temperature between sink and system, and is often graphed or averaged against expected conditions.
Coefficient of variation
In probability theory and statistics, the coefficient of variation (CV), also known as relative standard deviation (RSD), is a standardized measure of dispersion of a probability distribution or frequency distribution. It is often expressed as a percentage, and is defined as the ratio of the standard deviation $\ \sigma$ to the mean $\ \mu$ (or its absolute value, $|\mu |$).
Coherence
In physics, two wave sources are perfectly coherent if they have a constant phase difference and the same frequency, and the same waveform. Coherence is an ideal property of waves that enables stationary (i.e. temporally and spatially constant) interference. It contains several distinct concepts, which are limiting cases that never quite occur in reality but allow an understanding of the physics of waves, and has become a very important concept in quantum physics. More generally, coherence describes all properties of the correlation between physical quantities of a single wave, or between several waves or wave packets.
Cohesion
or cohesive attraction or cohesive force is the action or property of like molecules sticking together, being mutually attractive. It is an intrinsic property of a substance that is caused by the shape and structure of its molecules, which makes the distribution of orbiting electrons irregular when molecules get close to one another, creating electrical attraction that can maintain a microscopic structure such as a water drop. In other words, cohesion allows for surface tension, creating a "solid-like" state upon which light-weight or low-density materials can be placed.
Cold forming
or cold working, any metal-working procedure (such as hammering, rolling, shearing, bending, milling, etc.) carried out below the metal's recrystallization temperature.
Combustion
or burning, is a high-temperature exothermic redox chemical reaction between a fuel (the reductant) and an oxidant, usually atmospheric oxygen, that produces oxidized, often gaseous products, in a mixture termed as smoke.
Compensation
Is planning for side effects or other unintended issues in a design. In a more simpler term, it is a "counter-procedure" plan on expected side effect performed to produce more efficient and useful results. The design of an invention can itself also be to compensate for some other existing issue or exception.
Compiler
A computer program that translates a high-level language into machine language.
Compressive strength
Compressive strength or compression strength is the capacity of a material or structure to withstand loads tending to reduce size, as opposed to tensile strength, which withstands loads tending to elongate. In other words, compressive strength resists compression (being pushed together), whereas tensile strength resists tension (being pulled apart). In the study of strength of materials, tensile strength, compressive strength, and shear strength can be analyzed independently.
Computational fluid dynamics
The numerical solution of flow equations in practical problems such as aircraft design or hydraulic structures.
Computer
A computer is a device that can be instructed to carry out sequences of arithmetic or logical operations automatically via computer programming. Modern computers have the ability to follow generalized sets of operations, called programs. These programs enable computers to perform an extremely wide range of tasks.
Computer-aided design
Computer-aided design (CAD) is the use of computer systems (or workstations) to aid in the creation, modification, analysis, or optimization of a design. CAD software is used to increase the productivity of the designer, improve the quality of design, improve communications through documentation, and to create a database for manufacturing. CAD output is often in the form of electronic files for print, machining, or other manufacturing operations. The term CADD (for computer aided design and drafting) is also used.
Computer-aided engineering
Computer-aided engineering (CAE) is the broad usage of computer software to aid in engineering analysis tasks. It includes finite element analysis (FEA), computational fluid dynamics (CFD), multibody dynamics (MBD), durability and optimization.
Computer-aided manufacturing
Computer-aided manufacturing (CAM) is the use of software to control machine tools and related ones in the manufacturing of workpieces. This is not the only definition for CAM, but it is the most common; CAM may also refer to the use of a computer to assist in all operations of a manufacturing plant, including planning, management, transportation and storage.
Computer engineering
Computer engineering is a discipline that integrates several fields of computer science and electronics engineering required to develop computer hardware and software.
Computer science
is the theory, experimentation, and engineering that form the basis for the design and use of computers. It involves the study of algorithms that process, store, and communicate digital information. A computer scientist specializes in the theory of computation and the design of computational systems.
Concave lens
Lenses are classified by the curvature of the two optical surfaces. A lens is biconvex (or double convex, or just convex) if both surfaces are convex. If both surfaces have the same radius of curvature, the lens is equiconvex. A lens with two concave surfaces is biconcave (or just concave). If one of the surfaces is flat, the lens is plano-convex or plano-concave depending on the curvature of the other surface. A lens with one convex and one concave side is convex-concave or meniscus.
Condensed matter physics
is the field of physics that deals with the macroscopic and microscopic physical properties of matter. In particular it is concerned with the "condensed" phases that appear whenever the number of constituents in a system is extremely large and the interactions between the constituents are strong.
Confidence interval
In statistics, a confidence interval or compatibility interval (CI) is a type of interval estimate, computed from the statistics of the observed data, that might contain the true value of an unknown population parameter. The interval has an associated confidence level that, loosely speaking, quantifies the level of confidence that the parameter lies in the interval. More strictly speaking, the confidence level represents the frequency (i.e. the proportion) of possible confidence intervals that contain the true value of the unknown population parameter. In other words, if confidence intervals are constructed using a given confidence level from an infinite number of independent sample statistics, the proportion of those intervals that contain the true value of the parameter will be equal to the confidence level.
Conjugate acid
A conjugate acid, within the Brønsted–Lowry acid–base theory, is a species formed by the reception of a proton (H^{+}) by a base—in other words, it is a base with a hydrogen ion added to it. On the other hand, a conjugate base is what is left over after an acid has donated a proton during a chemical reaction. Hence, a conjugate base is a species formed by the removal of a proton from an acid. Because some acids are capable of releasing multiple protons, the conjugate base of an acid may itself be acidic.
Conjugate base
A conjugate acid, within the Brønsted–Lowry acid–base theory, is a species formed by the reception of a proton (H^{+}) by a base—in other words, it is a base with a hydrogen ion added to it. On the other hand, a conjugate base is what is left over after an acid has donated a proton during a chemical reaction. Hence, a conjugate base is a species formed by the removal of a proton from an acid. Because some acids are capable of releasing multiple protons, the conjugate base of an acid may itself be acidic.
Conservation of energy
In physics and chemistry, the law of conservation of energy states that the total energy of an isolated system remains constant; it is said to be conserved over time. This law means that energy can neither be created nor destroyed; rather, it can only be transformed or transferred from one form to another.
Conservation of mass
The law of conservation of mass or principle of mass conservation states that for any system closed to all transfers of matter and energy, the mass of the system must remain constant over time, as system's mass cannot change, so quantity cannot be added nor removed. Hence, the quantity of mass is conserved over time.
Continuity equation
A continuity equation in physics is an equation that describes the transport of some quantity. It is particularly simple and powerful when applied to a conserved quantity, but it can be generalized to apply to any extensive quantity. Since mass, energy, momentum, electric charge and other natural quantities are conserved under their respective appropriate conditions, a variety of physical phenomena may be described using continuity equations.
Continuum mechanics
is a branch of mechanics that deals with the mechanical behavior of materials modeled as a continuous mass rather than as discrete particles. The French mathematician Augustin-Louis Cauchy was the first to formulate such models in the 19th century.
Control engineering
Control engineering or control systems engineering is an engineering discipline that applies automatic control theory to design systems with desired behaviors in control environments. The discipline of controls overlaps and is usually taught along with electrical engineering at many institutions around the world. .
Convex lens
Lenses are classified by the curvature of the two optical surfaces. A lens is biconvex (or double convex, or just convex) if both surfaces are convex. If both surfaces have the same radius of curvature, the lens is equiconvex. A lens with two concave surfaces is biconcave (or just concave). If one of the surfaces is flat, the lens is plano-convex or plano-concave depending on the curvature of the other surface. A lens with one convex and one concave side is convex-concave or meniscus.
Corrosion
is a natural process, which converts a refined metal to a more chemically-stable form, such as its oxide, hydroxide, or sulfide. It is the gradual destruction of materials (usually metals) by chemical and/or electrochemical reaction with their environment. Corrosion engineering is the field dedicated to controlling and stopping corrosion.
Cosmic rays
Cosmic rays are high-energy radiation, mainly originating outside the Solar System.
Coulomb
The coulomb (symbol: C) is the International System of Units (SI) unit of electric charge. It is the charge (symbol: Q or q) transported by a constant current of one ampere in one second:

$$1 ~ \text{C}=1 ~ \text{A} \cdot 1 ~ \text{s}$$

Thus, it is also the amount of excess charge on a capacitor of one farad charged to a potential difference of one volt:

$$1 ~ \text{C}=1 ~ \text{F} \cdot 1 ~ \text{V}$$

The coulomb is equivalent to the charge of approximately 6.242×10^{18} (1.036×10^{−5} mol) protons, and −1 C is equivalent to the charge of approximately 6.242×10^{18} electrons.

A new definition, in terms of the elementary charge, will take effect on 20 May 2019.

The new definition defines the elementary charge (the charge of the proton) as exactly 1.602176634×10^{−19} coulombs. This would implicitly define the coulomb as 1/0.1602176634×10^{18} elementary charges.
Coulomb's law
Coulomb's law, or Coulomb's inverse-square law, is a law of physics for quantifying Coulomb's force, or electrostatic force. Electrostatic force is the amount of force with which stationary, electrically charged particles either repel, or attract each other. This force and the law for quantifying it, represent one of the most basic forms of force used in the physical sciences, and were an essential basis to the study and development of the theory and field of classical electromagnetism. The law was first published in 1785 by French physicist Charles-Augustin de Coulomb. In its scalar form, the law is:

$$F=k_e\frac{q_1 q_2}{r^2}$$,

where k_{e} is the Coulomb constant (k_{e} ≈ 9×10^{9} N⋅m^{2}⋅C^{−2}), q_{1} and q_{2} are the signed magnitudes of the charges, and the scalar r is the distance between the charges. The force of the interaction between the charges is attractive if the charges have opposite signs (i.e., F is negative) and repulsive if like-signed (i.e., F is positive).

Being an inverse-square law, the law is analogous to Isaac Newton's inverse-square law of universal gravitation. Coulomb's law can be used to derive Gauss's law, and vice versa.
Covalent bond
A covalent bond, also called a molecular bond, is a chemical bond that involves the sharing of electron pairs between atoms.
Crookes tube
A type of vacuum tube that demonstrates cathode rays.
Cryogenics
The science of low temperatures.
Crystallization
Crystallization is the (natural or artificial) process by which a solid forms, where the atoms or molecules are highly organized into a structure known as a crystal. Some of the ways by which crystals form are precipitating from a solution, freezing, or more rarely deposition directly from a gas. Attributes of the resulting crystal depend largely on factors such as temperature, air pressure, and in the case of liquid crystals, time of fluid evaporation.
Crystallography
The study of crystals.
Curvilinear motion
describes the motion of a moving particle that conforms to a known or fixed curve. The study of such motion involves the use of two co-ordinate systems, the first being planar motion and the latter being cylindrical motion.
Cyclotron
A cyclotron is a type of particle accelerator invented by Ernest O. Lawrence in 1929–1930 at the University of California, Berkeley, and patented in 1932. A cyclotron accelerates charged particles outwards from the center along a spiral path. The particles are held to a spiral trajectory by a static magnetic field and accelerated by a rapidly varying (radio frequency) electric field. Lawrence was awarded the 1939 Nobel prize in physics for this invention.

== D ==
Dalton's law
In chemistry and physics, Dalton's law (also called Dalton's law of partial pressures) states that in a mixture of non-reacting gases, the total pressure exerted is equal to the sum of the partial pressures of the individual gases.
Damped vibration
Any vibration with a force acting against it to lessen the vibration over time.
Darcy–Weisbach equation
An equation used in fluid mechanics to find the pressure change cause by friction within a pipe or conduit.
DC motor
An electrical motor driven by direct current.
Decibel
A logarithmic unit of ratios.
Definite integral
The integral of a function between an upper and lower limit.
Deflection
is the degree to which a structural element is displaced under a load. It may refer to an angle or a distance.
Deformation (engineering)
In materials science, deformation refers to any changes in the shape or size of an object due to
- an applied force (the deformation energy in this case is transferred through work) or
- a change in temperature (the deformation energy in this case is transferred through heat).

The first case can be a result of tensile (pulling) forces, compressive (pushing) forces, shear, bending, or torsion (twisting).

In the second case, the most significant factor, which is determined by the temperature, is the mobility of the structural defects such as grain boundaries, point vacancies, line and screw dislocations, stacking faults and twins in both crystalline and non-crystalline solids. The movement or displacement of such mobile defects is thermally activated, and thus limited by the rate of atomic diffusion.
Deformation (mechanics)
Deformation in continuum mechanics is the transformation of a body from a reference configuration to a current configuration. A configuration is a set containing the positions of all particles of the body. A deformation may be caused by external loads, body forces (such as gravity or electromagnetic forces), or changes in temperature, moisture content, or chemical reactions, etc.
Degrees of freedom
The number of parameters required to define the motion of a dynamical system.
Delta robot
A tripod linkage, used to construct fast-acting manipulators with a wide range of movement.
Delta-wye transformer
A type of transformer used in three-phase power systems.
De Moivre–Laplace theorem
In probability theory, the de Moivre–Laplace theorem, which is a special case of the central limit theorem, states that the normal distribution may be used as an approximation to the binomial distribution under certain conditions. In particular, the theorem shows that the probability mass function of the random number of "successes" observed in a series of $n$ independent Bernoulli trials, each having probability $p$ of success (a binomial distribution with $n$ trials), converges to the probability density function of the normal distribution with mean $np$ and standard deviation$\sqrt{np(1-p)}$, as $n$ grows large, assuming $p$ is not $0$ or $1$.
Density
The density, or more precisely, the volumetric mass density, of a substance is its mass per unit volume. The symbol most often used for density is ρ (the lower case Greek letter rho), although the Latin letter D can also be used. Mathematically, density is defined as mass divided by volume:

$$\rho=\frac{m}{V}$$

where ρ is the density, m is the mass, and V is the volume. In some cases (for instance, in the United States oil and gas industry), density is loosely defined as its weight per unit volume, although this is scientifically inaccurate – this quantity is more specifically called specific weight.
Derivative
The derivative of a function of a real variable measures the sensitivity to change of the function value (output value) with respect to a change in its argument (input value). Derivatives are a fundamental tool of calculus. For example, the derivative of the position of a moving object with respect to time is the object's velocity: this measures how quickly the position of the object changes when time advances.
Design engineering
.
Dew point
The pressure and temperature at which air is holding the maximum possible humidity.
Diamagnetism
Diamagnetic materials are repelled by a magnetic field; an applied magnetic field creates an induced magnetic field in them in the opposite direction, causing a repulsive force. In contrast, paramagnetic and ferromagnetic materials are attracted by a magnetic field. Diamagnetism is a quantum mechanical effect that occurs in all materials; when it is the only contribution to the magnetism, the material is called diamagnetic. In paramagnetic and ferromagnetic substances the weak diamagnetic force is overcome by the attractive force of magnetic dipoles in the material. The magnetic permeability of diamagnetic materials is less than μ_{0}, the permeability of vacuum. In most materials diamagnetism is a weak effect which can only be detected by sensitive laboratory instruments, but a superconductor acts as a strong diamagnet because it repels a magnetic field entirely from its interior.
Dielectric
An insulator, a material that does not permit free flow of electricity.
Differential pressure
.
Differential pulley
A differential pulley, also called Weston differential pulley, or colloquially chain fall, is used to manually lift very heavy objects like car engines. It is operated by pulling upon the slack section of a continuous chain that wraps around pulleys. The relative size of two connected pulleys determines the maximum weight that can be lifted by hand. The load will remain in place (and not lower under the force of gravity) until the chain is pulled.
Differential signaling
is a method for electrically transmitting information using two complementary signals.
Diffusion
Is the net movement of molecules or atoms from a region of higher concentration (or high chemical potential) to a region of lower concentration (or low chemical potential).
Dimensional analysis
is the analysis of the relationships between different physical quantities by identifying their base quantities (such as length, mass, time, and electric charge) and units of measure (such as miles vs. kilometers, or pounds vs. kilograms) and tracking these dimensions as calculations or comparisons are performed. The conversion of units from one dimensional unit to another is often somewhat complex. Dimensional analysis, or more specifically the factor-label method, also known as the unit-factor method, is a widely used technique for such conversions using the rules of algebra.
Direct integration of a beam
Direct integration is a structural analysis method for measuring internal shear, internal moment, rotation, and deflection of a beam. For a beam with an applied weight $w(x)$, taking downward to be positive, the internal shear force is given by taking the negative integral of the weight:

$$V(x)=-\int w(x)\, dx$$

The internal moment M(x) is the integral of the internal shear:

$M(x)=\int V(x)\, dx$=$-\int [\int w(x)\ \, dx] dx$

The angle of rotation from the horizontal, $\theta$, is the integral of the internal moment divided by the product of the Young's modulus and the area moment of inertia:

$$\theta (x)=\frac{1}{EI} \int M(x)\, dx$$

Integrating the angle of rotation obtains the vertical displacement $\nu$:

$$\nu (x)=\int \theta (x) dx$$.

Dispersion
In optics, dispersion is the phenomenon in which the phase velocity of a wave depends on its frequency. Media having this common property may be termed dispersive media. Sometimes the term chromatic dispersion is used for specificity. Although the term is used in the field of optics to describe light and other electromagnetic waves, dispersion in the same sense can apply to any sort of wave motion such as acoustic dispersion in the case of sound and seismic waves, in gravity waves (ocean waves), and for telecommunication signals along transmission lines (such as coaxial cable) or optical fiber.
Displacement (fluid)
In fluid mechanics, displacement occurs when an object is immersed in a fluid, pushing it out of the way and taking its place. The volume of the fluid displaced can then be measured, and from this, the volume of the immersed object can be deduced (the volume of the immersed object will be exactly equal to the volume of the displaced fluid).
Displacement (vector)
is a vector whose length is the shortest distance from the initial to the final position of a point P. It quantifies both the distance and direction of an imaginary motion along a straight line from the initial position to the final position of the point. A displacement may be identified with the translation that maps the initial position to the final position.
Distance
is a numerical measurement of how far apart objects are.
Doppler effect
The Doppler effect (or the Doppler shift) is the change in frequency or wavelength of a wave in relation to an observer who is moving relative to the wave source. It is named after the Austrian physicist Christian Doppler, who described the phenomenon in 1842.
Dose–response relationship
The dose–response relationship, or exposure–response relationship, describes the magnitude of the response of an organism, as a function of exposure (or doses) to a stimulus or stressor (usually a chemical) after a certain exposure time. Dose–response relationships can be described by dose–response curves. A stimulus response function or stimulus response curve is defined more broadly as the response from any type of stimulus, not limited to chemicals.
Drag
In fluid dynamics, drag (sometimes called air resistance, a type of friction, or fluid resistance, another type of friction or fluid friction) is a force acting opposite to the relative motion of any object moving with respect to a surrounding fluid. This can exist between two fluid layers (or surfaces) or a fluid and a solid surface. Unlike other resistive forces, such as dry friction, which are nearly independent of velocity, drag forces depend on velocity. Drag force is proportional to the velocity for a laminar flow and the squared velocity for a turbulent flow. Even though the ultimate cause of a drag is viscous friction, the turbulent drag is independent of viscosity. Drag forces always decrease fluid velocity relative to the solid object in the fluid's path.
Drift current
In condensed matter physics and electrochemistry, drift current is the electric current, or movement of charge carriers, which is due to the applied electric field, often stated as the electromotive force over a given distance. When an electric field is applied across a semiconductor material, a current is produced due to the flow of charge carriers.
Ductility
is a measure of a material's ability to undergo significant plastic deformation before rupture, which may be expressed as percent elongation or percent area reduction from a tensile test.
Dynamics
is the branch of classical mechanics concerned with the study of forces and their effects on motion. Isaac Newton defined the fundamental physical laws which govern dynamics in physics, especially his second law of motion.
Dyne
is a derived unit of force specified in the centimetre–gram–second (CGS) system of units, a predecessor of the modern SI.

== E ==
Economics
The scientific study of the production, distribution and consumption of goods.
Effusion
In physics and chemistry, effusion is the process in which a gas escapes from a container through a hole of diameter considerably smaller than the mean free path of the molecules.
Elastic modulus
The amount a material will deform per unit force.
Elasticity
In physics, elasticity is the ability of a body to resist a distorting influence and to return to its original size and shape when that influence or force is removed. Solid objects will deform when adequate forces are applied to them. If the material is elastic, the object will return to its initial shape and size when these forces are removed.
Electric charge
is the physical property of matter that causes it to experience a force when placed in an electromagnetic field. There are two types of electric charges; positive and negative (commonly carried by protons and electrons respectively). Like charges repel and unlike attract. An object with an absence of net charge is referred to as neutral. Early knowledge of how charged substances interact is now called classical electrodynamics, and is still accurate for problems that do not require consideration of quantum effects.
Electric circuit
is an electrical network consisting of a closed loop, giving a return path for the current.
Electric current
is a flow of electric charge. In electric circuits this charge is often carried by moving electrons in a wire. It can also be carried by ions in an electrolyte, or by both ions and electrons such as in an ionised gas (plasma). The SI unit for measuring an electric current is the ampere, which is the flow of electric charge across a surface at the rate of one coulomb per second. Electric current is measured using a device called an ammeter.
Electric displacement field
In physics, the electric displacement field, denoted by D, is a vector field that appears in Maxwell's equations. It accounts for the effects of free and bound charge within materials. D stands for "displacement", as in the related concept of displacement current in dielectrics. In free space, the electric displacement field is equivalent to flux density, a concept that lends understanding to Gauss's law. In the International System of Units (SI), it is expressed in units of coulomb per meter squared (C⋅m^{−2}).
Electric generator
In electricity generation, a generator, also called electric generator, electrical generator, and electromagnetic generator is a device that converts motive power (mechanical energy) into electrical power for use in an external circuit. Sources of mechanical energy include steam turbines, gas turbines, water turbines, internal combustion engines and even hand cranks.
Electric field
surrounds an electric charge, and exerts force on other charges in the field, attracting or repelling them. Electric field is sometimes abbreviated as E-field.
Electric field gradient
In atomic, molecular, and solid-state physics, the electric field gradient (EFG) measures the rate of change of the electric field at an atomic nucleus generated by the electronic charge distribution and the other nuclei.
Electric motor
is an electrical machine that converts electrical energy into mechanical energy. Most electric motors operate through the interaction between the motor's magnetic field and winding currents to generate force in the form of rotation. Electric motors can be powered by direct current (DC) sources, such as from batteries, motor vehicles or rectifiers, or by alternating current (AC) sources, such as a power grid, inverters or electrical generators. An electric generator is mechanically identical to an electric motor, but operates in the reverse direction, accepting mechanical energy (such as from flowing water) and converting this mechanical energy into electrical energy.
Electric potential
(Also called the electric field potential, potential drop or the electrostatic potential) is the amount of work needed to move a unit of positive charge from a reference point to a specific point inside the field without producing an acceleration. Typically, the reference point is the Earth or a point at infinity, although any point beyond the influence of the electric field charge can be used.
Electrical potential energy
Electric potential energy, or electrostatic potential energy, is a potential energy (measured in joules) that results from conservative Coulomb forces and is associated with the configuration of a particular set of point charges within a defined system. An object may have electric potential energy by virtue of two key elements: its own electric charge and its relative position to other electrically charged objects. The term "electric potential energy" is used to describe the potential energy in systems with time-variant electric fields, while the term "electrostatic potential energy" is used to describe the potential energy in systems with time-invariant electric fields.
Electric power
is the rate, per unit time, at which electrical energy is transferred by an electric circuit. The SI unit of power is the watt, one joule per second.
Electrical engineering
is a technical discipline concerned with the study, design and application of equipment, devices and systems which use electricity, electronics, and electromagnetism. It emerged as an identified activity in the latter half of the 19th century after commercialization of the electric telegraph, the telephone, and electrical power generation, distribution and use. .
Electrical conductance
The electrical resistance of an object is a measure of its opposition to the flow of electric current. The inverse quantity is electrical conductance, and is the ease with which an electric current passes. Electrical resistance shares some conceptual parallels with the notion of mechanical friction. The SI unit of electrical resistance is the ohm (Ω), while electrical conductance is measured in siemens (S).
Electrical conductor
is an object or type of material that allows the flow of charge (electrical current) in one or more directions. Materials made of metal are common electrical conductors. Electrical current is generated by the flow of negatively charged electrons, positively charged holes, and positive or negative ions in some cases.
Electrical impedance
is the measure of the opposition that a circuit presents to a current when a voltage is applied. The term complex impedance may be used interchangeably.
Electrical insulator
is a material whose internal electric charges do not flow freely; very little electric current will flow through it under the influence of an electric field. This contrasts with other materials, semiconductors and conductors, which conduct electric current more easily. The property that distinguishes an insulator is its resistivity; insulators have higher resistivity than semiconductors or conductors.
Electrical network
is an interconnection of electrical components (e.g., batteries, resistors, inductors, capacitors, switches, transistors) or a model of such an interconnection, consisting of electrical elements (e.g., voltage sources, current sources, resistances, inductances, capacitances). An electrical circuit is a network consisting of a closed loop, giving a return path for the current. Linear electrical networks, a special type consisting only of sources (voltage or current), linear lumped elements (resistors, capacitors, inductors), and linear distributed elements (transmission lines), have the property that signals are linearly superimposable. They are thus more easily analyzed, using powerful frequency domain methods such as Laplace transforms, to determine DC response, AC response, and transient response.
Electrical resistance
The electrical resistance of an object is a measure of its opposition to the flow of electric current. The inverse quantity is electrical conductance, and is the ease with which an electric current passes. Electrical resistance shares some conceptual parallels with the notion of mechanical friction. The SI unit of electrical resistance is the ohm (Ω), while electrical conductance is measured in siemens (S).
Electricity
Is the set of physical phenomena associated with the presence and motion of matter that has a property of electric charge. Electricity is related to magnetism, both being part of the phenomenon of electromagnetism, as described by Maxwell's equations. Various common phenomena are related to electricity, including lightning, static electricity, electric heating, and electric discharges.
Electrodynamics
In physics, the phenomena associated with moving electric charges, and their interaction with electric and magnetic fields; the study of these phenomena.
Electromagnet
is a type of magnet in which the magnetic field is produced by an electric current. Electromagnets usually consist of wire wound into a coil. A current through the wire creates a magnetic field which is concentrated in the hole, denoting the centre of the coil. The magnetic field disappears when the current is turned off. The wire turns are often wound around a magnetic core made from a ferromagnetic or ferrimagnetic material such as iron; the magnetic core concentrates the magnetic flux and makes a more powerful magnet.
Electromagnetic field
An electromagnetic field (also EM field) is a classical (i.e. non-quantum) field produced by accelerating electric charges. It is the field described by classical electrodynamics and is the classical counterpart to the quantized electromagnetic field tensor in quantum electrodynamics. The electromagnetic field propagates at the speed of light (in fact, this field can be identified as light) and interacts with charges and currents. Its quantum counterpart is one of the four fundamental forces of nature (the others are gravitation, weak interaction and strong interaction.)
Electromagnetic radiation
In physics, electromagnetic radiation (EM radiation or EMR) refers to the waves (or their quanta, photons) of the electromagnetic field, propagating (radiating) through space, carrying electromagnetic radiant energy. It includes radio waves, microwaves, infrared, (visible) light, ultraviolet, X-rays, and gamma rays.
Electromechanics
Electromechanics combines processes and procedures drawn from electrical engineering and mechanical engineering. Electromechanics focuses on the interaction of electrical and mechanical systems as a whole and how the two systems interact with each other. This process is especially prominent in systems such as those of DC or AC rotating electrical machines which can be designed and operated to generate power from a mechanical process (generator) or used to power a mechanical effect (motor). Electrical engineering in this context also encompasses electronics engineering.
Electron
is a subatomic particle, symbol e^{−} or β^{−}, whose electric charge is negative one elementary charge. Electrons belong to the first generation of the lepton particle family, and are generally thought to be elementary particles because they have no known components or substructure. The electron has a mass that is approximately 1/1836 that of the proton. Quantum mechanical properties of the electron include an intrinsic angular momentum (spin) of a half-integer value, expressed in units of the reduced Planck constant, ħ. Being fermions, no two electrons can occupy the same quantum state, in accordance with the Pauli exclusion principle. Like all elementary particles, electrons exhibit properties of both particles and waves: they can collide with other particles and can be diffracted like light. The wave properties of electrons are easier to observe with experiments than those of other particles like neutrons and protons because electrons have a lower mass and hence a longer de Broglie wavelength for a given energy.
Electronvolt
In physics, an electronvolt (symbol eV, also written electron-volt and electron volt) is the amount of kinetic energy gained by a single electron accelerating from rest through an electric potential difference of one volt in vacuum. When used as a unit of energy, the numerical value of 1 eV in joules (symbol J) is equivalent to the numerical value of the charge of an electron in coulombs (symbol C). Under the 2019 revision of the SI, this sets 1 eV equal to the exact value 1.602176634×10^{−19} J.
Electron pair
In chemistry, an electron pair, or Lewis pair, consists of two electrons that occupy the same molecular orbital but have opposite spins. Gilbert N. Lewis introduced the concepts of both the electron pair and the covalent bond in a landmark paper he published in 1916.
Electronegativity
Symbolized as χ, is the measurement of the tendency of an atom to attract a shared pair of electrons (or electron density). An atom's electronegativity is affected by both its atomic number and the distance at which its valence electrons reside from the charged nucleus. The higher the associated electronegativity, the more an atom or a substituent group attracts electrons.
Electronics
Comprises the physics, engineering, technology and applications that deal with the emission, flow and control of electrons in vacuum and matter. It uses active devices to control electron flow by amplification and rectification, which distinguishes it from classical electrical engineering which uses passive effects such as resistance, capacitance, and inductance to control current flow.
Elemental analysis
Is a process where a sample of some material (e.g., soil, waste or drinking water, bodily fluids, minerals, chemical compounds) is analyzed for its elemental and sometimes isotopic composition. Elemental analysis can be qualitative (determining what elements are present), and it can be quantitative (determining how much of each are present). Elemental analysis falls within the ambit of analytical chemistry, the set of instruments involved in deciphering the chemical nature of our world.
Endothermic process
Is any process with an increase in the enthalpy H (or internal energy U) of the system. In such a process, a closed system usually absorbs thermal energy from its surroundings, which is heat transfer into the system. It may be a chemical process, such as dissolving ammonium nitrate in water, or a physical process, such as the melting of ice cubes.
Energy
In physics, energy is the quantitative property that must be transferred to an object in order to perform work on, or to heat, the object. (Note: The second law of thermodynamics imposes limitations on the capacity of a system to transfer energy by performing work, since some of the system's energy might necessarily be consumed in the form of heat instead. See e.g. Lehrman, Robert L. (1973). "Energy Is Not The Ability To Do Work". The Physics Teacher. 11 (1): 15–18. Bibcode:1973PhTea..11...15L. doi:10.1119/1.2349846. ISSN 0031-921X.) Energy is a conserved quantity; the law of conservation of energy states that energy can be converted in form, but not created or destroyed. The SI unit of energy is the joule, which is the energy transferred to an object by the work of moving it a distance of 1 metre against a force of 1 newton.
Engine
An engine or motor is a machine designed to convert one form of energy into mechanical energy. Heat engines convert heat into work via various thermodynamic processes. The internal combustion engine is perhaps the most common example of a heat engine, in which heat from the combustion of a fuel causes rapid pressurisation of the gaseous combustion products in the combustion chamber, causing them to expand and drive a piston, which turns a crankshaft. Electric motors convert electrical energy into mechanical motion, pneumatic motors use compressed air, and clockwork motors in wind-up toys use elastic energy. In biological systems, molecular motors, like myosins in muscles, use chemical energy to create forces and ultimately motion.
Engineering
Is the use of scientific principles to design and build machines, structures, and other items, including bridges, tunnels, roads, vehicles, and buildings. The discipline of engineering encompasses a broad range of more specialized fields of engineering, each with a more specific emphasis on particular areas of applied mathematics, applied science, and types of application. The term engineering is derived from the Latin ingenium, meaning "cleverness" and ingeniare, meaning "to contrive, devise".
Engineering economics
Engineering economics, previously known as engineering economy, is a subset of economics concerned with the use and "...application of economic principles" in the analysis of engineering decisions. As a discipline, it is focused on the branch of economics known as microeconomics in that it studies the behavior of individuals and firms in making decisions regarding the allocation of limited resources. Thus, it focuses on the decision making process, its context and environment. It is pragmatic by nature, integrating economic theory with engineering practice. But, it is also a simplified application of microeconomic theory in that it assumes elements such as price determination, competition and demand/supply to be fixed inputs from other sources. As a discipline though, it is closely related to others such as statistics, mathematics and cost accounting. It draws upon the logical framework of economics but adds to that the analytical power of mathematics and statistics.
Engineering ethics
Is the field of system of moral principles that apply to the practice of engineering. The field examines and sets the obligations by engineers to society, to their clients, and to the profession. As a scholarly discipline, it is closely related to subjects such as the philosophy of science, the philosophy of engineering, and the ethics of technology.
Environmental engineering
Is a job type that is a professional engineering discipline and takes from broad scientific topics like chemistry, biology, ecology, geology, hydraulics, hydrology, microbiology, and mathematics to create solutions that will protect and also improve the health of living organisms and improve the quality of the environment. Environmental engineering is a sub-discipline of civil engineering and chemical engineering.
Engineering physics
Or engineering science, refers to the study of the combined disciplines of physics, mathematics, chemistry, biology, and engineering, particularly computer, nuclear, electrical, electronic, aerospace, materials or mechanical engineering. By focusing on the scientific method as a rigorous basis, it seeks ways to apply, design, and develop new solutions in engineering.
Enzyme
Enzymes are proteins that act as biological catalysts (biocatalysts). Catalysts accelerate chemical reactions. The molecules upon which enzymes may act are called substrates, and the enzyme converts the substrates into different molecules known as products. Almost all metabolic processes in the cell need enzyme catalysis in order to occur at rates fast enough to sustain life.
Escape velocity
The minimum velocity at which an object can escape a gravitation field.
Estimator
In statistics, an estimator is a rule for calculating an estimate of a given quantity based on observed data: thus the rule (the estimator), the quantity of interest (the estimand) and its result (the estimate) are distinguished. For example, the sample mean is a commonly used estimator of the population mean. There are point and interval estimators. The point estimators yield single-valued results, although this includes the possibility of single vector-valued results and results that can be expressed as a single function. This is in contrast to an interval estimator, where the result would be a range of plausible values (or vectors or functions).
Euler–Bernoulli beam theory
Euler–Bernoulli beam theory (also known as engineer's beam theory or classical beam theory) is a simplification of the linear theory of elasticity which provides a means of calculating the load-carrying and deflection characteristics of beams. It covers the case for small deflections of a beam that are subjected to lateral loads only. It is thus a special case of Timoshenko beam theory. It was first enunciated circa 1750, but was not applied on a large scale until the development of the Eiffel Tower and the Ferris wheel in the late 19th century. Following these successful demonstrations, it quickly became a cornerstone of engineering and an enabler of the Second Industrial Revolution. Additional mathematical models have been developed such as plate theory, but the simplicity of beam theory makes it an important tool in the sciences, especially structural and mechanical engineering.
Exothermic process
In thermodynamics, the term exothermic process (exo- : "outside") describes a process or reaction that releases energy from the system to its surroundings, usually in the form of heat, but also in a form of light (e.g. a spark, flame, or flash), electricity (e.g. a battery), or sound (e.g. explosion heard when burning hydrogen). Its etymology stems from the Greek prefix έξω (exō, which means "outwards") and the Greek word θερμικός (thermikόs, which means "thermal").

== F ==
Factor of safety
(FoS), also known as (and used interchangeably with) safety factor (SF), expresses how much stronger a system is than it needs to be for an intended load.
Falling bodies
.
Farad
The farad (symbol: F) is the SI derived unit of electrical capacitance, the ability of a body to store an electrical charge. It is named after the English physicist Michael Faraday.
Faraday constant
Denoted by the symbol F and sometimes stylized as ℱ, is named after Michael Faraday. In physics and chemistry, this constant represents the magnitude of electric charge per mole of electrons. It has the value

9.648533212...×10^{4} C⋅mol^{−1}.

This constant has a simple relation to two other physical constants:

$$F = eN_\text{A}$$

where

e = 1.602176634×10^{−19} C
N_{A} = 6.02214076×10^{23} mol^{−1}.

Both of these values have exact defined values, and hence F has a known exact value. N_{A} is the Avogadro constant (the ratio of the number of particles, N, which is unitless, to the amount of substance, n, in units of moles), and e is the elementary charge or the magnitude of the charge of an electron. This relation holds because the amount of charge of a mole of electrons is equal to the amount of charge in one electron multiplied by the number of electrons in a mole.
Fermat's principle
In optics, Fermat's principle, or the principle of least time, named after French mathematician Pierre de Fermat, is the principle that the path taken between two points by a ray of light is the path that can be traversed in the least time. This principle is sometimes taken as the definition of a ray of light. However, this version of the principle is not general; a more modern statement of the principle is that rays of light traverse the path of stationary optical length with respect to variations of the path. In other words, a ray of light prefers the path such that there are other paths, arbitrarily nearby on either side, along which the ray would take almost exactly the same time to traverse.
Fick's laws of diffusion
Describe diffusion and were derived by Adolf Fick in 1855. They can be used to solve for the diffusion coefficient, D. Fick's first law can be used to derive his second law which in turn is identical to the diffusion equation.
Finite element method
(FEM), is the most widely used method for solving problems of engineering and mathematical models. Typical problem areas of interest include the traditional fields of structural analysis, heat transfer, fluid flow, mass transport, and electromagnetic potential. The FEM is a particular numerical method for solving partial differential equations in two or three space variables (i.e., some boundary value problems). To solve a problem, the FEM subdivides a large system into smaller, simpler parts that are called finite elements. This is achieved by a particular space discretization in the space dimensions, which is implemented by the construction of a mesh of the object: the numerical domain for the solution, which has a finite number of points. The finite element method formulation of a boundary value problem finally results in a system of algebraic equations. The method approximates the unknown function over the domain. The simple equations that model these finite elements are then assembled into a larger system of equations that models the entire problem. The FEM then uses variational methods from the calculus of variations to approximate a solution by minimizing an associated error function.
FIRST
For Inspiration and Recognition of Science and Technology – is an organization founded by inventor Dean Kamen in 1989 to develop ways to inspire students in engineering and technology fields.
Fission
In nuclear physics and nuclear chemistry, nuclear fission is a nuclear reaction or a radioactive decay process in which the nucleus of an atom splits into two or more smaller, lighter nuclei. The fission process often produces gamma photons, and releases a very large amount of energy even by the energetic standards of radioactive decay.
Flow velocity
In continuum mechanics the flow velocity in fluid dynamics, also macroscopic velocity in statistical mechanics, or drift velocity in electromagnetism, is a vector field used to mathematically describe the motion of a continuum. The length of the flow velocity vector is the flow speed and is a scalar. It is also called velocity field; when evaluated along a line, it is called a velocity profile (as in, e.g., law of the wall).
Fluid
In physics, a fluid is a substance that continually deforms (flows) under an applied shear stress, or external force. Fluids are a phase of matter and include liquids, gases, and plasmas. They are substances with zero shear modulus, or, in simpler terms, substances which cannot resist any shear force applied to them.
Fluid dynamics
In physics and engineering, fluid dynamics is a subdiscipline of fluid mechanics that describes the flow of fluids—liquids and gases. It has several subdisciplines, including aerodynamics (the study of air and other gases in motion) and hydrodynamics (the study of liquids in motion).
Fluid mechanics
Is the branch of physics concerned with the mechanics of fluids (liquids, gases, and plasmas) and the forces on them. It has applications in a wide range of disciplines, including mechanical, civil, chemical and biomedical engineering, geophysics, oceanography, meteorology, astrophysics, and biology.
Fluid statics
Fluid statics, or hydrostatics, is the branch of fluid mechanics that studies "fluids at rest and the pressure in a fluid or exerted by a fluid on an immersed body".
Flywheel
Is a mechanical device specifically designed to use the conservation of angular momentum so as to efficiently store rotational energy; a form of kinetic energy proportional to the product of its moment of inertia and the square of its rotational speed. In particular, if we assume the flywheel's moment of inertia to be constant (i.e., a flywheel with fixed mass and second moment of area revolving about some fixed axis) then the stored (rotational) energy is directly associated with the square of its rotational speed.
Focus
In geometrical optics, a focus, also called an image point, is the point where light rays originating from a point on the object converge. Although the focus is conceptually a point, physically the focus has a spatial extent, called the blur circle. This non-ideal focusing may be caused by aberrations of the imaging optics. In the absence of significant aberrations, the smallest possible blur circle is the Airy disc, which is caused by diffraction from the optical system's aperture. Aberrations tend worsen as the aperture diameter increases, while the Airy circle is smallest for large apertures.
Foot-pound
The foot-pound force (symbol: ft⋅lbf, ft⋅lb_{f}, or ft⋅lb) is a unit of work or energy in the engineering and gravitational systems in United States customary and imperial units of measure. It is the energy transferred upon applying a force of one pound-force (lbf) through a linear displacement of one foot. The corresponding SI unit is the joule.
Fracture toughness
In materials science, fracture toughness is the critical stress intensity factor of a sharp crack where propagation of the crack suddenly becomes rapid and unlimited. A component's thickness affects the constraint conditions at the tip of a crack with thin components having plane stress conditions and thick components having plane strain conditions. Plane strain conditions give the lowest fracture toughness value which is a material property. The critical value of stress intensity factor in mode I loading measured under plane strain conditions is known as the plane strain fracture toughness, denoted $K_\text{Ic}$. When a test fails to meet the thickness and other test requirements that are in place to ensure plane strain conditions, the fracture toughness value produced is given the designation $K_\text{c}$. Fracture toughness is a quantitative way of expressing a material's resistance to crack propagation and standard values for a given material are generally available.
Fraunhofer lines
In physics and optics, the Fraunhofer lines are a set of spectral absorption lines named after the German physicist Joseph von Fraunhofer (1787–1826). The lines were originally observed as dark features (absorption lines) in the optical spectrum of the Sun.
Free fall
In Newtonian physics, free fall is any motion of a body where gravity is the only force acting upon it. In the context of general relativity, where gravitation is reduced to a space-time curvature, a body in free fall has no force acting on it.
Frequency modulation
Frequency modulation (FM) is the encoding of information in a carrier wave by varying the instantaneous frequency of the wave. The technology is used in telecommunications, radio broadcasting, signal processing, and computing.
Freezing point
The melting point (or, rarely, liquefaction point) of a substance is the temperature at which it changes state from solid to liquid. At the melting point the solid and liquid phase exist in equilibrium. The melting point of a substance depends on pressure and is usually specified at a standard pressure such as 1 atmosphere or 100 kPa. When considered as the temperature of the reverse change from liquid to solid, it is referred to as the freezing point or crystallization point. Because of the ability of substances to supercool, the freezing point can easily appear to be below its actual value. When the "characteristic freezing point" of a substance is determined, in fact the actual methodology is almost always "the principle of observing the disappearance rather than the formation of ice, that is, the melting point.
Friction
Is the force resisting the relative motion of solid surfaces, fluid layers, and material elements sliding against each other. There are several types of friction:
- Dry friction is a force that opposes the relative lateral motion of two solid surfaces in contact. Dry friction is subdivided into static friction ("stiction") between non-moving surfaces, and kinetic friction between moving surfaces. With the exception of atomic or molecular friction, dry friction generally arises from the interaction of surface features, known as asperities (see Figure 1).
- Fluid friction describes the friction between layers of a viscous fluid that are moving relative to each other.
- Lubricated friction is a case of fluid friction where a lubricant fluid separates two solid surfaces.
- Skin friction is a component of drag, the force resisting the motion of a fluid across the surface of a body.
- Internal friction is the force resisting motion between the elements making up a solid material while it undergoes deformation.
Function
In mathematics, a function (Note: The words map, mapping, transformation, correspondence, and operator are often used synonymously. Halmos 1970, p. 30.) is a binary relation between two sets that associates every element of the first set to exactly one element of the second set. Typical examples are functions from integers to integers, or from the real numbers to real numbers.
Fundamental frequency
The fundamental frequency, often referred to simply as the fundamental, is defined as the lowest frequency of a periodic waveform. In music, the fundamental is the musical pitch of a note that is perceived as the lowest partial present. In terms of a superposition of sinusoids, the fundamental frequency is the lowest frequency sinusoidal in the sum of harmonically related frequencies, or the frequency of the difference between adjacent frequencies. In some contexts, the fundamental is usually abbreviated as f_{0}, indicating the lowest frequency counting from zero. In other contexts, it is more common to abbreviate it as f_{1}, the first harmonic. (The second harmonic is then f_{2}=2⋅f_{1}, etc. In this context, the zeroth harmonic would be 0 Hz.)
Fundamental interaction
In physics, the fundamental interactions, also known as fundamental forces, are the interactions that do not appear to be reducible to more basic interactions. There are four fundamental interactions known to exist: the gravitational and electromagnetic interactions, which produce significant long-range forces whose effects can be seen directly in everyday life, and the strong and weak interactions, which produce forces at minuscule, subatomic distances and govern nuclear interactions. Some scientists hypothesize that a fifth force might exist, but these hypotheses remain speculative.
Fundamental theorem of calculus
Is a theorem that links the concept of differentiating a function with the concept of integrating a function.
Fundamentals of Engineering Examination (US)
The Fundamentals of Engineering (FE) exam, also referred to as the Engineer in Training (EIT) exam, and formerly in some states as the Engineering Intern (EI) exam, is the first of two examinations that engineers must pass in order to be licensed as a Professional Engineer in the United States. The second examination is Principles and Practice of Engineering Examination. The FE exam is open to anyone with a degree in engineering or a related field, or currently enrolled in the last year of an ABET-accredited engineering degree program. Some state licensure boards permit students to take it prior to their final year, and numerous states allow those who have never attended an approved program to take the exam if they have a state-determined number of years of work experience in engineering. Some states allow those with ABET-accredited "Engineering Technology" or "ETAC" degrees to take the examination. The state of Michigan has no admission pre-requisites for the FE. The exam is administered by the National Council of Examiners for Engineering and Surveying (NCEES).

== G ==
Galvanic cell
A galvanic cell or voltaic cell, named after Luigi Galvani or Alessandro Volta, respectively, is an electrochemical cell that derives electrical energy from spontaneous redox reactions taking place within the cell. It generally consists of two different metals immersed in electrolytes, or of individual half-cells with different metals and their ions in solution connected by a salt bridge or separated by a porous membrane. Volta was the inventor of the voltaic pile, the first electrical battery. In common usage, the word "battery" has come to include a single galvanic cell, but a battery properly consists of multiple cells.
Gamma rays
A gamma ray, or gamma radiation (symbol γ or $\gamma$), is a penetrating form of electromagnetic radiation arising from the radioactive decay of atomic nuclei. It consists of the shortest wavelength electromagnetic waves and so imparts the highest photon energy.
Gas
Is one of the four fundamental states of matter (the others being solid, liquid, and plasma). A pure gas may be made up of individual atoms (e.g. a noble gas like neon), elemental molecules made from one type of atom (e.g. oxygen), or compound molecules made from a variety of atoms (e.g. carbon dioxide). A gas mixture, such as air, contains a variety of pure gases. What distinguishes a gas from liquids and solids is the vast separation of the individual gas particles.
Gauge pressure
Is zero-referenced against ambient air pressure, so it is equal to absolute pressure minus atmospheric pressure.
Geiger counter
Is an instrument used for detecting and measuring ionizing radiation. Also known as a Geiger–Muller counter (or Geiger–Müller counter), it is widely used in applications such as radiation dosimetry, radiological protection, experimental physics, and the nuclear industry.
General relativity
General relativity, also known as the general theory of relativity, is the geometric theory of gravitation published by Albert Einstein in 1915 and is the current description of gravitation in modern physics. General relativity generalizes special relativity and refines Newton's law of universal gravitation, providing a unified description of gravity as a geometric property of space and time or four-dimensional spacetime. In particular, the curvature of spacetime is directly related to the energy and momentum of whatever matter and radiation are present. The relation is specified by the Einstein field equations, a system of partial differential equations.
Geometric mean
In mathematics, the geometric mean is a mean or average, which indicates the central tendency or typical value of a set of numbers by using the product of their values (as opposed to the arithmetic mean which uses their sum). The geometric mean is defined as the nth root of the product of n numbers, i.e., for a set of numbers x_{1}, x_{2}, ..., x_{n}, the geometric mean is defined as

$$\left(\prod_{i=1}^n x_i\right)^\frac{1}{n}=\sqrt[n]{x_1 x_2 \cdots x_n}$$

Geometry
Is, with arithmetic, one of the oldest branches of mathematics. It is concerned with properties of space that are related with distance, shape, size, and relative position of figures. A mathematician who works in the field of geometry is called a geometer.
Geophysics
Is a subject of natural science concerned with the physical processes and physical properties of the Earth and its surrounding space environment, and the use of quantitative methods for their analysis. The term geophysics sometimes refers only to geological applications: Earth's shape; its gravitational and magnetic fields; its internal structure and composition; its dynamics and their surface expression in plate tectonics, the generation of magmas, volcanism and rock formation. However, modern geophysics organizations and pure scientists use a broader definition that includes the water cycle including snow and ice; fluid dynamics of the oceans and the atmosphere; electricity and magnetism in the ionosphere and magnetosphere and solar–terrestrial relations; and analogous problems associated with the Moon and other planets.
Geotechnical engineering
Also known as geotechnics, is the branch of civil engineering concerned with the engineering behavior of earth materials. It uses the principles and methods of soil mechanics and rock mechanics for the solution of engineering problems and the design of engineering works. It also relies on knowledge of geology, hydrology, geophysics, and other related sciences.
Gluon
Is an elementary particle that acts as the exchange particle (or gauge boson) for the strong force between quarks. It is analogous to the exchange of photons in the electromagnetic force between two charged particles. In layman's terms, they "glue" quarks together, forming hadrons such as protons and neutrons. In technical terms, gluons are vector gauge bosons that mediate strong interactions of quarks in quantum chromodynamics (QCD). Gluons themselves carry the color charge of the strong interaction. This is unlike the photon, which mediates the electromagnetic interaction but lacks an electric charge. Gluons therefore participate in the strong interaction in addition to mediating it, making QCD significantly harder to analyze than quantum electrodynamics (QED).
Graham's law
Graham's law of effusion (also called Graham's law of diffusion) was formulated by Scottish physical chemist Thomas Graham in 1848. Graham found experimentally that the rate of effusion of a gas is inversely proportional to the square root of the mass of its particles. This formula can be written as:

$${\mbox{Rate}_1 \over \mbox{Rate}_2}=\sqrt{M_2 \over M_1}$$,

where:

Rate_{1} is the rate of effusion for the first gas. (volume or number of moles per unit time).
Rate_{2} is the rate of effusion for the second gas.
M_{1} is the molar mass of gas 1
M_{2} is the molar mass of gas 2.

Gravitational constant
The gravitational constant (also known as the universal gravitational constant, the Newtonian constant of gravitation, or the Cavendish gravitational constant), (Note: "Newtonian constant of gravitation" is the name introduced for G by Boys (1894). Use of the term by T.E. Stern (1928) was misquoted as "Newton's constant of gravitation" in Pure Science Reviewed for Profound and Unsophisticated Students (1930), in what is apparently the first use of that term. Use of "Newton's constant" (without specifying "gravitation" or "gravity") is more recent, as "Newton's constant" was also used for the heat transfer coefficient in Newton's law of cooling, but has by now become quite common, e.g. Calmet et al, Quantum Black Holes (2013), p. 93; P. de Aquino, Beyond Standard Model Phenomenology at the LHC (2013), p. 3. The name "Cavendish gravitational constant", sometimes "Newton–Cavendish gravitational constant", appears to have been common in the 1970s to 1980s, especially in (translations from) Soviet-era Russian literature, e.g. Sagitov (1970 [1969]), Soviet Physics: Uspekhi 30 (1987), Issues 1–6, p. 342 [etc.]. "Cavendish constant" and "Cavendish gravitational constant" is also used in Charles W. Misner, Kip S. Thorne, John Archibald Wheeler, "Gravitation", (1973), 1126f. Colloquial use of "Big G", as opposed to "little g" for gravitational acceleration dates to the 1960s (R.W. Fairbridge, The encyclopedia of atmospheric sciences and astrogeology, 1967, p. 436; note use of "Big G's" vs. "little g's" as early as the 1940s of the Einstein tensor G_{μν} vs. the metric tensor g_{μν}, Scientific, medical, and technical books published in the United States of America: a selected list of titles in print with annotations: supplement of books published 1945–1948, Committee on American Scientific and Technical Bibliography National Research Council, 1950, p. 26).) denoted by the letter G, is an empirical physical constant involved in the calculation of gravitational effects in Sir Isaac Newton's law of universal gravitation and in Albert Einstein's general theory of relativity.
Gravitational energy
Gravitational energy or gravitational potential energy is the potential energy a massive object has in relation to another massive object due to gravity. It is the potential energy associated with the gravitational field, which is released (converted into kinetic energy) when the objects fall towards each other. Gravitational potential energy increases when two objects are brought further apart. For two pairwise interacting point particles, the gravitational potential energy $U$ is given by

$$U=-\frac{GMm}{R},$$

where $M$ and $m$ are the masses of the two particles, $R$ is the distance between them, and $G$ is the gravitational constant.

Close to the Earth's surface, the gravitational field is approximately constant, and the gravitational potential energy of an object reduces to

$$U=mgh$$

where $m$ is the object's mass, $g=GM_E/R_E^2$ is the gravity of Earth, and $h$ is the height of the object's center of mass above a chosen reference level.
Gravitational field
In physics, a gravitational field is a model used to explain the influences that a massive body extends into the space around itself, producing a force on another massive body. Thus, a gravitational field is used to explain gravitational phenomena, and is measured in newtons per kilogram (N/kg). In its original concept, gravity was a force between point masses. Following Isaac Newton, Pierre-Simon Laplace attempted to model gravity as some kind of radiation field or fluid, and since the 19th century, explanations for gravity have usually been taught in terms of a field model, rather than a point attraction. In a field model, rather than two particles attracting each other, the particles distort spacetime via their mass, and this distortion is what is perceived and measured as a "force". In such a model one states that matter moves in certain ways in response to the curvature of spacetime, and that there is either no gravitational force, or that gravity is a fictitious force. Gravity is distinguished from other forces by its obedience to the equivalence principle.
Gravitational potential
In classical mechanics, the gravitational potential at a location is equal to the work (energy transferred) per unit mass that would be needed to move an object to that location from a fixed reference location. It is analogous to the electric potential with mass playing the role of charge. The reference location, where the potential is zero, is by convention infinitely far away from any mass, resulting in a negative potential at any finite distance. In mathematics, the gravitational potential is also known as the Newtonian potential and is fundamental in the study of potential theory. It may also be used for solving the electrostatic and magnetostatic fields generated by uniformly charged or polarized ellipsoidal bodies.
Gravitational wave
Gravitational waves are disturbances in the curvature of spacetime, generated by accelerated masses, that propagate as waves outward from their source at the speed of light. They were proposed by Henri Poincaré in 1905 and subsequently predicted in 1916 by Albert Einstein on the basis of his general theory of relativity. Gravitational waves transport energy as gravitational radiation, a form of radiant energy similar to electromagnetic radiation. Newton's law of universal gravitation, part of classical mechanics, does not provide for their existence, since that law is predicated on the assumption that physical interactions propagate instantaneously (at infinite speed) – showing one of the ways the methods of classical physics are unable to explain phenomena associated with relativity.
Gravity
Or gravitation, is a natural phenomenon by which all things with mass or energy—including planets, stars, galaxies, and even light—are brought toward (or gravitate toward) one another. On Earth, gravity gives weight to physical objects, and the Moon's gravity causes the ocean tides. The gravitational attraction of the original gaseous matter present in the Universe caused it to begin coalescing and forming stars and caused the stars to group together into galaxies, so gravity is responsible for many of the large-scale structures in the Universe. Gravity has an infinite range, although its effects become increasingly weaker as objects get further away.
Ground state
The ground state of a quantum-mechanical system is its lowest-energy state; the energy of the ground state is known as the zero-point energy of the system. An excited state is any state with energy greater than the ground state. In quantum field theory, the ground state is usually called the vacuum state or the vacuum.

== H ==
Half-life
The period at which one-half of a quantity of an unstable isotope has decayed into other elements; the time at which half of a substance has diffused out of or otherwise reacted in a system.
Haptic
Tactile feedback technology using the operator's sense of touch. Also sometimes applied to robot manipulators with their own touch sensitivity.
Hardness
Is a measure of the resistance to localized plastic deformation induced by either mechanical indentation or abrasion. Some materials (e.g. metals) are harder than others (e.g. plastics, wood). Macroscopic hardness is generally characterized by strong intermolecular bonds, but the behavior of solid materials under force is complex; therefore, there are different measurements of hardness: scratch hardness, indentation hardness, and rebound hardness. Hardness is dependent on ductility, elastic stiffness, plasticity, strain, strength, toughness, viscoelasticity, and viscosity.
Harmonic mean
In mathematics, the harmonic mean (sometimes called the subcontrary mean) is one of several kinds of average, and in particular, one of the Pythagorean means. Typically, it is appropriate for situations when the average of rates is desired. The harmonic mean can be expressed as the reciprocal of the arithmetic mean of the reciprocals of the given set of observations. As a simple example, the harmonic mean of 1, 4, and 4 is

$$\left(\frac{1^{-1} + 4^{-1} + 4^{-1}}{3}\right)^{-1}=\frac{3}{\frac{1}{1} + \frac{1}{4} + \frac{1}{4}}=\frac{3}{1.5}=2\,.$$

Heat
In thermodynamics, heat is energy in transfer to or from a thermodynamic system, by mechanisms other than thermodynamic work or transfer of matter.
Heat transfer
Is a discipline of thermal engineering that concerns the generation, use, conversion, and exchange of thermal energy (heat) between physical systems. Heat transfer is classified into various mechanisms, such as thermal conduction, thermal convection, thermal radiation, and transfer of energy by phase changes. Engineers also consider the transfer of mass of differing chemical species, either cold or hot, to achieve heat transfer. While these mechanisms have distinct characteristics, they often occur simultaneously in the same system.
Helmholtz free energy
In thermodynamics, the Helmholtz free energy (or Helmholtz energy) is a thermodynamic potential that measures the useful work obtainable from a closed thermodynamic system at a constant temperature and volume (isothermal, isochoric). The negative of the change in the Helmholtz energy during a process is equal to the maximum amount of work that the system can perform in a thermodynamic process in which volume is held constant. If the volume were not held constant, part of this work would be performed as boundary work. This makes the Helmholtz energy useful for systems held at constant volume. Furthermore, at constant temperature, the Helmholtz free energy is minimized at equilibrium.
Henderson–Hasselbalch equation
In chemistry and biochemistry, the Henderson–Hasselbalch equation

$$\ce{pH}=\ce{p}K_\ce{a} + \log_{10} \left( \frac{[\ce{Base}]}{[\ce{Acid}]} \right)$$

can be used to estimate the pH of a buffer solution. The numerical value of the acid dissociation constant, K_{a}, of the acid is known or assumed. The pH is calculated for given values of the concentrations of the acid, HA and of a salt, MA, of its conjugate base, A^{−}; for example, the solution may contain acetic acid and sodium acetate.
Henry's law
In physical chemistry, Henry's law is a gas law that states that the amount of dissolved gas in a liquid is proportional to its partial pressure above the liquid. The proportionality factor is called Henry's law constant. It was formulated by the English chemist William Henry, who studied the topic in the early 19th century.
Hertz
The SI unit of frequency, one cycle per second.
Hexapod
(platform) – a movable platform using six linear actuators. Often used in flight simulators they also have applications as a robotic manipulator.
Hexapod
(walker) – a six-legged walking robot, using a simple insect-like locomotion.
Hoist
Is a device used for lifting or lowering a load by means of a drum or lift-wheel around which rope or chain wraps. It may be manually operated, electrically or pneumatically driven and may use chain, fiber or wire rope as its lifting medium. The most familiar form is an elevator, the car of which is raised and lowered by a hoist mechanism. Most hoists couple to their loads using a lifting hook. Today, there are a few governing bodies for the North American overhead hoist industry which include the Hoist Manufactures Institute (HMI), ASME, and the Occupational Safety and Health Administration (OSHA). HMI is a product counsel of the Material Handling Industry of America consisting of hoist manufacturers promoting safe use of their products.
Horsepower
In measurement systems that use feet, the unit of power.
Hot working
Or hot forming, any metal-working procedure (such as forging, rolling, extruding, etc.) carried out above the metal's recrystallization temperature.
Huygens–Fresnel principle
The Huygens–Fresnel principle (named after Dutch physicist Christiaan Huygens and French physicist Augustin-Jean Fresnel) is a method of analysis applied to problems of wave propagation both in the far-field limit and in near-field diffraction and also reflection. It states that every point on a wavefront is itself the source of spherical wavelets, and the secondary wavelets emanating from different points mutually interfere. The sum of these spherical wavelets forms the wavefront.
Hydraulics
The study of fluid flow, or the generation of mechanical force and movement by liquid under pressure.
Hydrocarbon
A compound containing hydrogen and carbon atoms only; petroleum is made of hydrocarbons.

== I ==
Ice point
The freezing point of pure water at one atmosphere; 0°C (32°F).
Ideal gas
A model for gases that ignores intermolecular forces. Most gases are approximately ideal at some high temperature and low pressure.
Ideal gas constant
The constant in the gas law that relates pressure, volume and temperature.
Ideal gas law
Also called the general gas equation, is the equation of state of a hypothetical ideal gas. It is a good approximation of the behavior of many gases under many conditions, although it has several limitations. It was first stated by Benoît Paul Émile Clapeyron in 1834 as a combination of the empirical Boyle's law, Charles's law, Avogadro's law, and Gay-Lussac's law. The ideal gas law is often written in an empirical form:

$$PV=nRT$$

where $P$, $V$ and $T$ are the pressure, volume and temperature; $n$ is the amount of substance; and $R$ is the ideal gas constant. It is the same for all gases.

It can also be derived from the microscopic kinetic theory, as was achieved (apparently independently) by August Krönig in 1856 and Rudolf Clausius in 1857.
Identity
In mathematics, an identity is an equality relating one mathematical expression A to another mathematical expression B, such that A and B (which might contain some variables) produce the same value for all values of the variables within a certain range of validity. In other words, A = B is an identity if A and B define the same functions, and an identity is an equality between functions that are differently defined. For example, $(a+b)^2=a^2 + 2ab + b^2$ and $\cos^2\theta + \sin^2\theta=1$ are identities. Identities are sometimes indicated by the triple bar symbol ≡ instead of =, the equals sign.
Impedance (electrical)
In electrical engineering, electrical impedance is the measure of the opposition that a circuit presents to a current when a voltage is applied.
Inclined plane
Also known as a ramp, is a flat supporting surface tilted at an angle, with one end higher than the other, used as an aid for raising or lowering a load. The inclined plane is one of the six classical simple machines defined by Renaissance scientists. Inclined planes are widely used to move heavy loads over vertical obstacles; examples vary from a ramp used to load goods into a truck, to a person walking up a pedestrian ramp, to an automobile or railroad train climbing a grade.
Indefinite integral
A function whose derivative is a given function; an antiderivative.
Inductance
In electromagnetism and electronics, inductance is the tendency of an electrical conductor to oppose a change in the electric current flowing through it. The flow of electric current creates a magnetic field around the conductor. The field strength depends on the magnitude of the current, and follows any changes in current. From Faraday's law of induction, any change in magnetic field through a circuit induces an electromotive force (EMF) (voltage) in the conductors, a process known as electromagnetic induction. This induced voltage created by the changing current has the effect of opposing the change in current. This is stated by Lenz's law, and the voltage is called back EMF. Inductance is defined as the ratio of the induced voltage to the rate of change of current causing it. It is a proportionality factor that depends on the geometry of circuit conductors and the magnetic permeability of nearby materials. An electronic component designed to add inductance to a circuit is called an inductor. It typically consists of a coil or helix of wire.
Inductor
An inductor, also called a coil, choke, or reactor, is a passive two-terminal electrical component that stores energy in a magnetic field when electric current flows through it. An inductor typically consists of an insulated wire wound into a coil.
Industrial engineering
Is an engineering profession that is concerned with the optimization of complex processes, systems, or organizations by developing, improving and implementing integrated systems of people, money, knowledge, information and equipment. Industrial engineers use specialized knowledge and skills in the mathematical, physical and social sciences, together with the principles and methods of engineering analysis and design, to specify, predict, and evaluate the results obtained from systems and processes. From these results, they are able to create new systems, processes or situations for the useful coordination of labour, materials and machines and also improve the quality and productivity of systems, physical or social.
Inertia
Is the resistance of any physical object to any change in its velocity. This includes changes to the object's speed, or direction of motion. An aspect of this property is the tendency of objects to keep moving in a straight line at a constant speed, when no forces act upon them.
Infrasound
Infrasound, sometimes referred to as low-frequency sound, describes sound waves with a frequency below the lower limit of audibility (generally 20 Hz). Hearing becomes gradually less sensitive as frequency decreases, so for humans to perceive infrasound, the sound pressure must be sufficiently high. The ear is the primary organ for sensing low sound, but at higher intensities it is possible to feel infrasound vibrations in various parts of the body.
Integral
In mathematics, an integral assigns numbers to functions in a way that describes displacement, area, volume, and other concepts that arise by combining infinitesimal data. The process of finding integrals is called integration. Along with differentiation, integration is a fundamental operation of calculus, (Note: Integral calculus is a very well established mathematical discipline for which there are many sources. See Apostol 1967 and Anton, Bivens & Davis 2016, for example.) and serves as a tool to solve problems in mathematics and physics involving the area of an arbitrary shape, the length of a curve, and the volume of a solid, among others.
Integral transform
In mathematics, an integral transform maps a function from its original function space into another function space via integration, where some of the properties of the original function might be more easily characterized and manipulated than in the original function space. The transformed function can generally be mapped back to the original function space using the inverse transform.
International System of Units
The International System of Units (SI, abbreviated from the French Système international (d'unités)) is the modern form of the metric system. It is the only system of measurement with an official status in nearly every country in the world. It comprises a coherent system of units of measurement starting with seven base units, which are the second (the unit of time with the symbol s), metre (length, m), kilogram (mass, kg), ampere (electric current, A), kelvin (thermodynamic temperature, K), mole (amount of substance, mol), and candela (luminous intensity, cd). The system allows for an unlimited number of additional units, called derived units, which can always be represented as products of powers of the base units. (Note: For example, the SI unit of velocity is the metre per second, m⋅s^{−1}; of acceleration is the metre per second squared, m⋅s^{−2}; etc.) Twenty-two derived units have been provided with special names and symbols. (Note: For example the newton (N), the unit of force, equivalent to kg⋅m⋅s^{−2}; the joule (J), the unit of energy, equivalent to kg⋅m^{2}⋅s^{−2}, etc. The most recently named derived unit, the katal, was defined in 1999.) The seven base units and the 22 derived units with special names and symbols may be used in combination to express other derived units, (Note: For example, the recommended unit for the electric field strength is the volt per metre, V/m, where the volt is the derived unit for electric potential difference. The volt per metre is equal to kg⋅m⋅s^{−3}⋅A^{−1} when expressed in terms of base units.) which are adopted to facilitate measurement of diverse quantities. The SI system also provides twenty prefixes to the unit names and unit symbols that may be used when specifying power-of-ten (i.e. decimal) multiples and sub-multiples of SI units. The SI is intended to be an evolving system; units and prefixes are created and unit definitions are modified through international agreement as the technology of measurement progresses and the precision of measurements improves.
Interval estimation
In statistics, interval estimation is the use of sample data to calculate an interval of possible values of an unknown population parameter; this is in contrast to point estimation, which gives a single value. Jerzy Neyman (1937) identified interval estimation ("estimation by interval") as distinct from point estimation ("estimation by unique estimate"). In doing so, he recognized that then-recent work quoting results in the form of an estimate plus-or-minus a standard deviation indicated that interval estimation was actually the problem statisticians really had in mind.
Inorganic chemistry
Deals with synthesis and behavior of inorganic and organometallic compounds. This field covers chemical compounds that are not carbon-based, which are the subjects of organic chemistry. The distinction between the two disciplines is far from absolute, as there is much overlap in the subdiscipline of organometallic chemistry. It has applications in every aspect of the chemical industry, including catalysis, materials science, pigments, surfactants, coatings, medications, fuels, and agriculture.
Ion
Is a particle, atom or molecule with a net electrical charge. The charge of the electron is considered negative by convention. The negative charge of an ion is equal and opposite to charged proton(s) considered positive by convention. The net charge of an ion is non-zero due to its total number of electrons being unequal to its total number of protons.
Ionic bonding
Is a type of chemical bonding that involves the electrostatic attraction between oppositely charged ions, or between two atoms with sharply different electronegativities, and is the primary interaction occurring in ionic compounds. It is one of the main types of bonding along with covalent bonding and metallic bonding. Ions are atoms (or groups of atoms) with an electrostatic charge. Atoms that gain electrons make negatively charged ions (called anions). Atoms that lose electrons make positively charged ions (called cations). This transfer of electrons is known as electrovalence in contrast to covalence. In the simplest case, the cation is a metal atom and the anion is a nonmetal atom, but these ions can be of a more complex nature, e.g. molecular ions like NH^{+}_{4} or SO^{2−}_{4}. In simpler words, an ionic bond results from the transfer of electrons from a metal to a non-metal in order to obtain a full valence shell for both atoms.
Ionization
Ionization or ionisation is the process by which an atom or a molecule acquires a negative or positive charge by gaining or losing electrons, often in conjunction with other chemical changes. The resulting electrically charged atom or molecule is called an ion. Ionization can result from the loss of an electron after collisions with subatomic particles, collisions with other atoms, molecules and ions, or through the interaction with electromagnetic radiation. Heterolytic bond cleavage and heterolytic substitution reactions can result in the formation of ion pairs. Ionization can occur through radioactive decay by the internal conversion process, in which an excited nucleus transfers its energy to one of the inner-shell electrons causing it to be ejected.
Isotope
Isotopes are variants of a particular chemical element which differ in neutron number, and consequently in nucleon number. All isotopes of a given element have the same number of protons but different numbers of neutrons in each atom.

== J ==
J/psi meson
The J/ψ (J/psi) meson /ˈdʒeɪ ˈsaɪ ˈmiːzɒn/ or psion is a subatomic particle, a flavor-neutral meson consisting of a charm quark and a charm antiquark. Mesons formed by a bound state of a charm quark and a charm anti-quark are generally known as "charmonium". The J/ψ is the most common form of charmonium, due to its spin of 1 and its low rest mass. The J/ψ has a rest mass of 3.0969 GeV/c^{2}, just above that of the η_{c} (2.9836 GeV/c^{2}), and a mean lifetime of 7.2×10^{−21} s. This lifetime was about a thousand times longer than expected.
Joule
The SI unit of energy. The joule, (symbol: J), is a derived unit of energy in the International System of Units. It is equal to the energy transferred to (or work done on) an object when a force of one newton acts on that object in the direction of the object's motion through a distance of one metre (1 newton-metre or N⋅m). It is also the energy dissipated as heat when an electric current of one ampere passes through a resistance of one ohm for one second. It is named after the English physicist James Prescott Joule (1818–1889).
Joule heating
Also known as resistive, resistance, or Ohmic heating, is the process by which the passage of an electric current through a conductor produces heat.

== K ==
Kalman filter
In statistics and control theory, Kalman filtering, also known as linear quadratic estimation (LQE), is an algorithm that uses a series of measurements observed over time, containing statistical noise and other inaccuracies, and produces estimates of unknown variables that tend to be more accurate than those based on a single measurement alone, by estimating a joint probability distribution over the variables for each timeframe. The Kalman filter has numerous applications in technology.
Kelvin
Is an absolute thermodynamic temperature scale using as its null point absolute zero, the temperature at which all thermal motion ceases in the classical description of thermodynamics. The kelvin (symbol: K) is the base unit of temperature in the International System of Units (SI).
Kelvin–Planck statement
(Or the Heat Engine Statement), of the second law of thermodynamics states that it is impossible to devise a cyclically operating heat engine, the effect of which is to absorb energy in the form of heat from a single thermal reservoir and to deliver an equivalent amount of work. This implies that it is impossible to build a heat engine that has 100% thermal efficiency.
Kinematics
Is a branch of classical mechanics that describes the motion of points, bodies (objects), and systems of bodies (groups of objects) without considering the forces that caused the motion.

== L ==
Laminar flow
In fluid dynamics, laminar flow is characterized by fluid particles following smooth paths in layers, with each layer moving smoothly past the adjacent layers with little or no mixing. At low velocities, the fluid tends to flow without lateral mixing, and adjacent layers slide past one another like playing cards. There are no cross-currents perpendicular to the direction of flow, nor eddies or swirls of fluids. In laminar flow, the motion of the particles of the fluid is very orderly with particles close to a solid surface moving in straight lines parallel to that surface. Laminar flow is a flow regime characterized by high momentum diffusion and low momentum convection.
Laplace transform
In mathematics, the Laplace transform, named after its inventor Pierre-Simon Laplace (/ləˈplɑːs/), is an integral transform that converts a function of a real variable $t$ (often time) to a function of a complex variable $s$ (complex frequency). The transform has many applications in science and engineering because it is a tool for solving differential equations. In particular, it transforms differential equations into algebraic equations and convolution into multiplication.
LC circuit
A circuit consisting entirely of inductors (L) and capacitors (C).
Le Chatelier's principle
Le Chatelier's principle, also called Chatelier's principle, is a principle of chemistry used to predict the effect of a change in conditions on chemical equilibria. The principle is named after French chemist Henry Louis Le Chatelier, and sometimes also credited to Karl Ferdinand Braun, who discovered it independently. It can be stated as:

When any system at equilibrium for a long period of time is subjected to a change in concentration, temperature, volume, or pressure, (1) the system changes to a new equilibrium, and (2) this change partly counteracts the applied change.

It is common to treat the principle as a more general observation of systems, such as

When a settled system is disturbed, it will adjust to diminish the change that has been made to it

or, "roughly stated",

Any change in status quo prompts an opposing reaction in the responding system.

Lenz's law
Lenz's law, named after the physicist Emil Lenz who formulated it in 1834, states that the direction of the electric current which is induced in a conductor by a changing magnetic field is such that the magnetic field created by the induced current opposes the initial changing magnetic field. It is a qualitative law that specifies the direction of induced current, but states nothing about its magnitude. Lenz's law explains the direction of many effects in electromagnetism, such as the direction of voltage induced in an inductor or wire loop by a changing current, or the drag force of eddy currents exerted on moving objects in a magnetic field. Lenz's law may be seen as analogous to Newton's third law in classical mechanics.
Lepton
In particle physics, a lepton is an elementary particle of half-integer spin (spin 1/2) that does not undergo strong interactions. Two main classes of leptons exist: charged leptons (also known as the electron-like leptons), and neutral leptons (better known as neutrinos). Charged leptons can combine with other particles to form various composite particles such as atoms and positronium, while neutrinos rarely interact with anything, and are consequently rarely observed. The best known of all leptons is the electron.
Lever
Is a simple machine consisting of a beam or rigid rod pivoted at a fixed hinge, or fulcrum. A lever is a rigid body capable of rotating on a point on itself. On the basis of the locations of fulcrum, load and effort, the lever is divided into three types. Also, leverage is mechanical advantage gained in a system. It is one of the six simple machines identified by Renaissance scientists. A lever amplifies an input force to provide a greater output force, which is said to provide leverage. The ratio of the output force to the input force is the mechanical advantage of the lever. As such, the lever is a mechanical advantage device, trading off force against movement.
L'Hôpital's rule
In mathematics, more specifically calculus, L'Hôpital's rule or L'Hospital's rule (French: [lopital], English: /ˌloʊpiːˈtɑːl/, loh-pee-TAHL) provides a technique to evaluate limits of indeterminate forms. Application (or repeated application) of the rule often converts an indeterminate form to an expression that can be easily evaluated by substitution. The rule is named after the 17th-century French mathematician Guillaume de l'Hôpital. Although the rule is often attributed to L'Hôpital, the theorem was first introduced to him in 1694 by the Swiss mathematician Johann Bernoulli. L'Hôpital's rule states that for functions f and g which are differentiable on an open interval I except possibly at a point c contained in I, if $\lim_{x\to c}f(x)=\lim_{x\to c}g(x)=0 \text{ or} \pm\infty,$ and $g'(x)\ne 0$ for all x in I with x ≠ c, and $\lim_{x\to c}\frac{f'(x)}{g'(x)}$ exists, then

$$\lim_{x\to c}\frac{f(x)}{g(x)}=\lim_{x\to c}\frac{f'(x)}{g'(x)}.$$

The differentiation of the numerator and denominator often simplifies the quotient or converts it to a limit that can be evaluated directly.
Light
Light or visible light is electromagnetic radiation within the portion of the electromagnetic spectrum that can be perceived by the human eye. Visible light is usually defined as having wavelengths in the range of 400–700 nm, between the infrared (with longer wavelengths) and the ultraviolet (with shorter wavelengths). This wavelength means a frequency range of roughly 430–750 terahertz (THz).
Linear actuator
Is an actuator that creates motion in a straight line, in contrast to the circular motion of a conventional electric motor. Linear actuators are used in machine tools and industrial machinery, in computer peripherals such as disk drives and printers, in valves and dampers, and in many other places where linear motion is required. Hydraulic or pneumatic cylinders inherently produce linear motion. Many other mechanisms are used to generate linear motion from a rotating motor.
Linear algebra
The mathematics of equations where the unknowns are only in the first power.
Linear elasticity
Is a mathematical model of how solid objects deform and become internally stressed due to prescribed loading conditions. It is a simplification of the more general nonlinear theory of elasticity and a branch of continuum mechanics.
Liquid
A liquid is a nearly incompressible fluid that conforms to the shape of its container but retains a (nearly) constant volume independent of pressure. As such, it is one of the four fundamental states of matter (the others being solid, gas, and plasma), and is the only state with a definite volume but no fixed shape. A liquid is made up of tiny vibrating particles of matter, such as atoms, held together by intermolecular bonds. Like a gas, a liquid is able to flow and take the shape of a container. Most liquids resist compression, although others can be compressed. Unlike a gas, a liquid does not disperse to fill every space of a container, and maintains a fairly constant density. A distinctive property of the liquid state is surface tension, leading to wetting phenomena. Water is, by far, the most common liquid on Earth.
Logarithm
In mathematics, the logarithm is the inverse function to exponentiation. That means the logarithm of a given number x is the exponent to which another fixed number, the base b, must be raised, to produce that number x. In the simplest case, the logarithm counts the number of occurrences of the same factor in repeated multiplication; e.g., since 1000 = 10 × 10 × 10 = 10^{3}, the "logarithm base 10" of 1000 is 3, or log_{10}(1000) = 3. The logarithm of x to base b is denoted as log_{b}(x), or without parentheses, log_{b} x, or even without the explicit base, log x, when no confusion is possible, or when the base does not matter such as in big O notation. More generally, exponentiation allows any positive real number as base to be raised to any real power, always producing a positive result, so log_{b}(x) for any two positive real numbers b and x, where b is not equal to 1, is always a unique real number y. More explicitly, the defining relation between exponentiation and logarithm is:

$\log_b(x)=y \$ exactly if $\ b^y=x\$ and $\ x > 0$ and $\ b > 0$ and $\ b \ne 1$.

For example, log_{2} 64=6, as 2^{6}=64.

The logarithm base 10 (that is b=10) is called the decimal or common logarithm and is commonly used in science and engineering. The natural logarithm has the number e (that is b ≈ 2.718) as its base; its use is widespread in mathematics and physics, because of its simpler integral and derivative. The binary logarithm uses base 2 (that is b=2) and is frequently used in computer science. Logarithms are examples of concave functions.
Logarithmic identities
Several important formulas, sometimes called logarithmic identities or log laws, relate logarithms to one another.
Logarithmic mean temperature difference
(Also known as log mean temperature difference, LMTD) is used to determine the temperature driving force for heat transfer in flow systems, most notably in heat exchangers. The LMTD is a logarithmic average of the temperature difference between the hot and cold feeds at each end of the double pipe exchanger. For a given heat exchanger with constant area and heat transfer coefficient, the larger the LMTD, the more heat is transferred. The use of the LMTD arises straightforwardly from the analysis of a heat exchanger with constant flow rate and fluid thermal properties.
Lumped capacitance model
A lumped-capacitance model, also called lumped system analysis, reduces a thermal system to a number of discrete "lumps" and assumes that the temperature difference inside each lump is negligible. This approximation is useful to simplify otherwise complex differential heat equations. It was developed as a mathematical analog of electrical capacitance, although it also includes thermal analogs of electrical resistance as well.
Lumped element model
The lumped-element model (also called lumped-parameter model, or lumped-component model) simplifies the description of the behaviour of spatially distributed physical systems into a topology consisting of discrete entities that approximate the behaviour of the distributed system under certain assumptions. It is useful in electrical systems (including electronics), mechanical multibody systems, heat transfer, acoustics, etc. Mathematically speaking, the simplification reduces the state space of the system to a finite dimension, and the partial differential equations (PDEs) of the continuous (infinite-dimensional) time and space model of the physical system into ordinary differential equations (ODEs) with a finite number of parameters.

== See also ==
- Outline of engineering
- Engineering
- National Council of Examiners for Engineering and Surveying
- Fundamentals of Engineering Examination
- Principles and Practice of Engineering Examination
- Graduate Aptitude Test in Engineering
- Glossary of aerospace engineering
- Glossary of civil engineering
- Glossary of electrical and electronics engineering
- Glossary of mechanical engineering
- Glossary of structural engineering
- Glossary of architecture
- Glossary of areas of mathematics
- Glossary of artificial intelligence
- Glossary of astronomy
- Glossary of biology
- Glossary of calculus
- Glossary of chemistry
- Glossary of ecology
- Glossary of economics
- Glossary of physics
- Glossary of probability and statistics
- List of established military terms § Engineering
