= Engineer in training =

U.S. professional certification level

Engineer in Training, or EIT, is a professional designation from the National Council of Examiners for Engineering and Surveying (NCEES) used in the United States to designate a person certified by the state as having completed two requirements:

- Completed a minimum of three years of post-secondary school at an ABET-accredited engineering program, or related science curriculum approved by the Board – Many states allow for the substitution of several years of engineering experience in place of the engineering degree requirement.
- Passed the NCEES six-hour Fundamentals of Engineering (FE) examination

Once an individual has passed the exam the state board awards that person an Engineer-in-Training (EIT) or an Engineer Intern (EI) designation. EIT and EI are equivalent variations in nomenclature that vary from state to state.

== Clarification of the term ==
"Engineer Intern" term could be possibly misleading term as it may imply that the engineer is still in college and is working merely in an intern position.

An Engineer-in-Training does engineering work, such as design, under the supervision and direction of a Professional Engineer, who are exclusively able to perform certain tasks, such as stamp and seal designs and offer services to the public.

In Canada, an E.I.T. designation means that the person has completed the educational requirement of their P.Eng but has yet to accrue enough work experience (or has yet to apply for a P.Eng). An EIT can perform engineering work under the supervision of a professional engineer. With the exception of New Brunswick, PEO (Ontario) and OIQ (Quebec), EITs are allowed to use the title "Engineer" as long as they also include the EIT designation in either their name or their title.

== Significance of the designation ==
In the United States of America, having an EIT designation shows an understanding of fundamental engineering principles, as EITs have passed the Fundamentals of Engineering (FE) exam. Canadian engineering has no equivalent to the FE exam for an EIT level.

== EIT designation as a part of PE licensure ==
Each state's statutes delineate the requirements for the experience and education needed to become a PE once EIT or EI certification has been earned. The requirements vary depending on the State and the licensing board, but for most engineers the process typically includes the following steps:

1. Graduate from an ABET-accredited four-year university engineering program.
2. Pass the 6-Hour Fundamentals of Engineering (FE) examination to receive an Engineer Intern (EI) enrollment or Engineer-in-Training (EIT) certification. The FE exam was an 8-hour exam prior to 2014. Some states such as Kansas and New York use the designation of IE (Intern Engineer), but is essentially the same as EI or EIT. Some states such as Iowa have no EIT or EI designation or certification available through their engineering boards. One just states s(he) passed the FE. An EI/EIT is not a requirement to take the PE exam; passing the FE is a requirement.
3. Accumulate a set amount of engineering experience, typically under the direction of a PE. In most states the requirement is four years, but in others the requirement is lower.
4. Pass the 8-hour Principles and Practice of Engineering exam to receive a PE designation

For Civil Engineers in California, passing two additional exams is required to gain PE licensure, which are the state-specific Civil Seismic Principles and Civil Engineering Surveying exams.
