= Electrical engineering technology =

Field of engineering

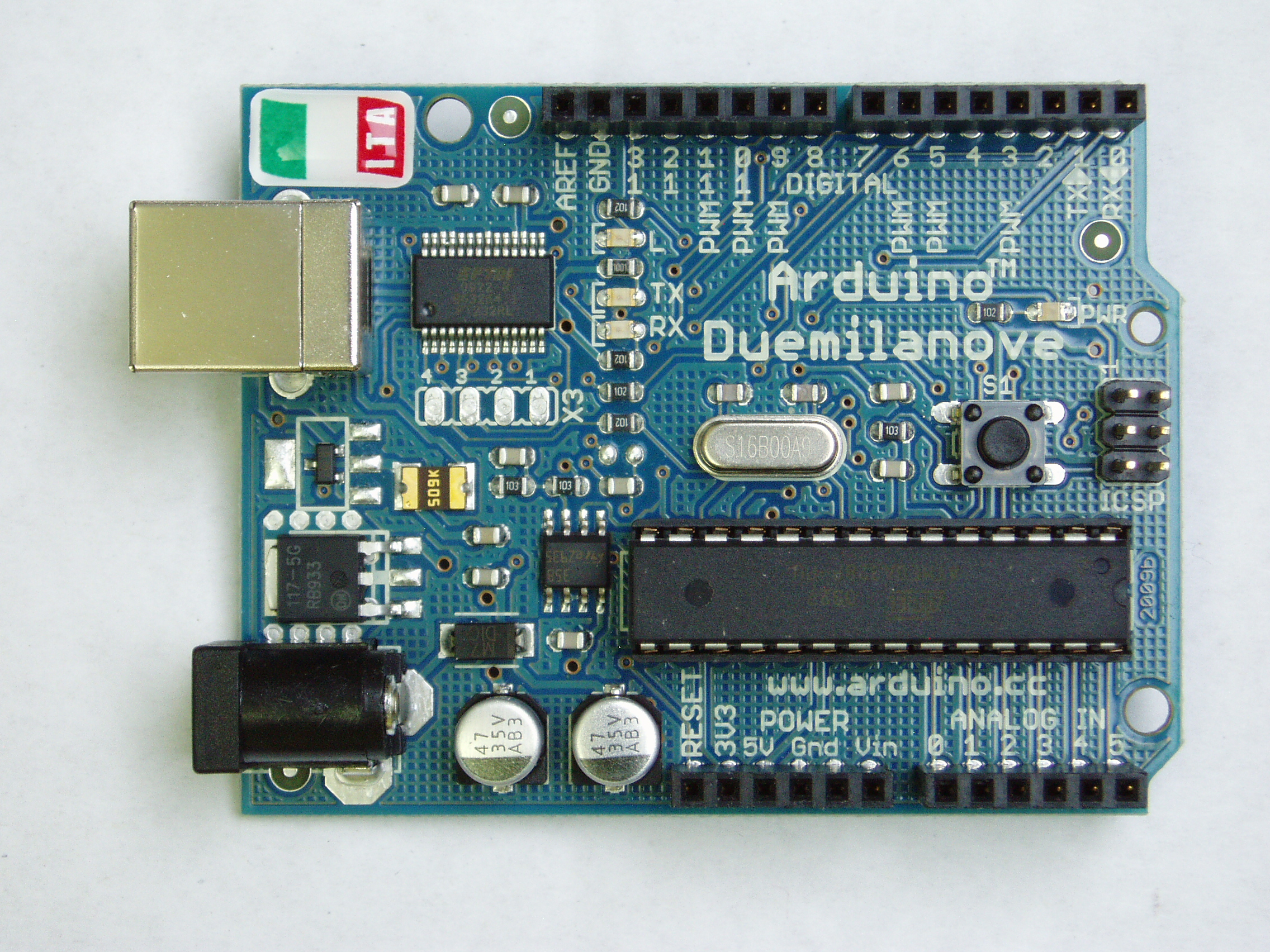
A microcontroller development board (Arduino Duemilanove), which could be used for embedded systems development.

Electrical/Electronics engineering technology (EET) is an engineering technology field that implements and applies the principles of electrical engineering. Like electrical engineering, EET deals with the "design, application, installation, manufacturing, operation or maintenance of electrical/electronic(s) systems." However, EET is a specialized discipline that has more focus on application, theory, and applied design, and implementation, while electrical engineering may focus more of a generalized emphasis on theory and conceptual design. Electrical/Electronic engineering technology is the largest branch of engineering technology and includes a diverse range of sub-disciplines, such as applied design, electronics, embedded systems, control systems, instrumentation, telecommunications, and power systems.

== Education ==
=== Accreditation ===
The Accreditation Board for Engineering and Technology (ABET) is the recognized organization for accrediting both undergraduate engineering and engineering technology programs in the United States.

=== Coursework ===
EET curricula can vary widely by institution type, degree type, program objective, and expected student outcome. Each year after, however, ABET publishes a set of minimum criteria that a given EET program (either associate degree or bachelor's degree) must meet in order to maintain its ABET accreditation. These criteria may be classified as either general criteria, which apply to all ABET accredited programs, or as program criteria, which apply to discipline-specific criteria.

==== Associate degree ====
Associate degree programs emphasize the practical field knowledge that is needed to maintain or troubleshoot existing electrical/electronic systems or to build and test new design prototypes.

Discipline-specific program outcomes include the application of circuit analysis and design, analog and digital electronics, computer programming, associated software, and relevant engineering standards

Coursework must be at a minimum algebra and trigonometry based.

==== Bachelor's degree ====
Bachelor's degree programs emphasize the analysis, design, and implementation of electrical/electronic systems. Some programs may focus on a specific sub-discipline, such as control systems or communications systems, while others may take a broader approach, introducing the student to several different sub-disciplines.

Math to differential equations is a minimum requirement for ABET accredited bachelor's level EET degrees. In addition, graduates must demonstrate an understanding of basic project management skills.

The United States Department of Commerce classifies the bachelor of science in electrical engineering technology (BSEET) as a STEM undergraduate engineering degree field.

In many states, recent graduates and students who are close to finishing an undergraduate BSEET degree are qualified to sit-in for the Fundamentals of Engineering exam while those BSEETs who have already gained at least four years’ post-college experience are qualified to sit-in for the Professional Engineer exam for their licensure in the United States. The importance of the licensing board requirements depend upon location, level of education, required years of experience, and the BSEETs sub-discipline are the passageways for becoming a licensed engineer. The knowledge obtained by a TAC/ABET accredited program is one pathway that may help students prepare for and pass the FE/PE exam. For example, in the United States and Canada, "only a licensed engineer may seal engineering work for public and private clients".

== Career ==
Graduates of electrical/electronics engineering technology programs work in a wide range of career fields. Some examples include:

- Engineering management
- Telecommunications
- Signal processing
- Medical technology and devices
- Instrumentation
- Integration Engineer
- Control
- Aerospace and avionics
- Computers
- Electrical power industry and power distribution
- Optics and Optoelectronics
- Manufacturing and manufacturing test engineer
- Marine Engineering
- Research and development
- Project management and Operations research
- Supervision/Management
- Systems analyst
- Technology management

=== Associate degree ===
Electrical/electronic engineering technicians may have a two-year associate degree and considered craftsman technicians. Eventually, with additional experience and certifications obtained then the craftsman technicians may advance to master craftsman technicians.

=== Bachelor degree ===
Electrical/electronic engineering technologists are broad specialists, rather than central technicians. EETs have a bachelor's degree and are considered applied electrical or electronic engineers because they have electrical engineering concepts to use in their work. Entry-level jobs in electrical or electronics engineering generally require a bachelor's degree in electrical engineering, electronics engineering, or electrical engineering technology.

== See also ==
- Outline of engineering
- IEEE
- Applied science
- Mechanical engineering technology
- Electronics and Computer Engineering
- Computer engineering
- Manufacturing engineering
