= American Engineers' Council for Professional Development =

Former engineering professional body

The American Engineers' Council for Professional Development or simply the Engineers' Council for Professional Development (ECPD), established in June 1932, was an engineering professional body dedicated to the education, accreditation, regulation and professional development of the engineering professionals and students in the United States. ECPD grew and has changed its name to ABET, Inc. and its focus solely to accreditation.

Its purpose was to set standards and to publish the Codes of Ethics and other material for engineers and engineering schools and organizations in the United States,

The seven engineering societies that established ECPD in 1932 were:

- The American Society of Civil Engineers (ASCE)
- The American Institute of Mining and Metallurgical Engineers, now the American Institute of Mining, Metallurgical, and Petroleum Engineers (AIME)
- The American Society of Mechanical Engineers (ASME)
- The American Institute of Electrical Engineers (AIEE), since 1963 merged into the Institute of Electrical and Electronics Engineers (IEEE)
- The Society for the Promotion of Engineering Education, now the American Society for Engineering Education (ASEE)
- The American Institute of Chemical Engineers (AIChE)
- The National Council of State Boards of Engineering Examiners, now the National Council of Examiners for Engineering and Surveying (NCEES)

ECPD was founded to provide a "joint program for upbuilding engineering as a profession". However, it almost immediately began developing as an accreditation agency, evaluating its first engineering program in 1936 and its first engineering technology program in 1946.

ECPD changed its name to Accreditation Board for Engineering and Technology (ABET) in 1980, and changed it again to ABET, Inc. in 2005.

ABET, Inc. is now an accreditation federation of 29 professional and technical societies (and one associate member society), representing the fields of applied science, computing, engineering, and technology.
