= Structural Engineering exam =

The Structural Engineering exam is a written examination given by state licensing boards in the United States as part of the testing for licensing structural engineers. This exam is written by the National Council of Examiners for Engineering and Surveying. It consists of 4 separate exams covering vertical and lateral forces, which are split into "breadth" and "depth" exams. The "depth" exams are offered twice per year while the "breadth" exams are offered year round. All four exams are fully digital.
