= Fundamentals of Engineering exam =

United States engineering exam

- Acronym: FE
- Type: Computer-based exam
- Administrator: National Council of Examiners for Engineering and Surveying
- Skills tested: Analytical reasoning, quantitative reasoning, discipline-specific subjects
- Purpose: Professional licensure
- Year started: 1965
- Duration: 6 hours
- Score range: Pass/fail
- Offered: Varies
- Prerequisites: Varies per state
- Fee: Varies per state
- Used by: Professional state licensing boards
- Website: ncees.org/engineering/fe/

The Fundamentals of Engineering (FE) exam, also referred to as the Engineer in Training (EIT) exam, and formerly in some states as the Engineering Intern (EI) exam, is the first of two examinations that engineers must pass in order to be licensed as a Professional Engineer (PE) in the United States. The second exam is the Principles and Practice of Engineering exam. The FE exam is open to anyone with a degree in engineering or a related field, or currently enrolled in the last year of an Accreditation Board for Engineering and Technology (ABET) accredited engineering degree program. Some state licensure boards permit students to take it prior to their final year, and numerous states allow those who have never attended an approved program to take the exam if they have a state-determined number of years of work experience in engineering. Some states allow those with ABET-accredited "Engineering Technology" or "ETAC" degrees to take the examination. The exam is administered by the National Council of Examiners for Engineering and Surveying (NCEES).

== History and structure ==
In 1965, 30 states administered the first FE exam. The FE tests knowledge of what college graduates should have mastered during school. In 1966, a national uniform PE exam was offered. As of 2014, the FE and FS exams are offered only via Computer Based Testing (CBT). The exam consists of 110 questions and is given during a 6-hour session, of which 5 hours and 20 minutes is designated as time for answering the questions. The remaining time includes a tutorial, presented at the beginning of the session, and an optional 25-minute break. Examinees must apply to be tested in one of seven fields: chemical, civil, electrical and computer, environmental, industrial and systems, mechanical, and other disciplines. Each examinee is provided with an electronic copy of a reference handbook compiled by NCEES, the only reference that may be used during the exam.

Prior to 2014, the exam was divided into two 4-hour sessions with a lunch break in between. The morning session consisted of 120 questions in a range of scientific/engineering subjects and had to be taken by all examinees, while the afternoon session consisted of 60 questions and could be taken either in a specific discipline or as a general engineering test. The reference handbook was distributed as a hard copy; examinees were not allowed to bring their own copies and had to return the provided ones at the end of each session.

In 2015, content changes in the exam were instituted to make it discipline-specific, with a plan of weaving general engineering subject matter (e.g. math and science fundamentals) throughout the exam. Less of the "full breadth" of most traditional engineering undergraduate curricula will be captured with this approach - such as the broad math and science foundation spanning chemistry, physics, mechanics (i.e. statics and dynamics), materials science, computer science, electronics/circuits, engineering design, and the standard range of engineering mathematics (i.e. calculus, differential equations, statistics). A concern was that, while most undergraduate engineering students are in fact exposed to most of these subjects, they may not necessarily take courses in specialized topics such as thermodynamics and fluid mechanics.

Since July 2020, the NCEES has made updates across all FE exam disciplines. For example, the topic "Computational Tools" was removed for the civil and mechanical disciplines. In other cases, topics and subtopics have been merged or combined. The NCEES also published an updated version of the tenth edition of the FE Reference Handbook. The handbook was revised incorporating a coherent single-page layout instead of a two-column layout, the addition and removal of a few new equations, and updated FE Exam Specifications.

== License ==
Those who pass the exam are sometimes designated Engineer In Training or Engineer Intern depending on their state's licensure board's approach to recognizing those who are partway through the licensure process. Many engineering firms will judge an engineering job applicant based on whether they have passed the FE exam and registered as an EIT. Passing the FE Exam shows that an applicant has not forgotten the basic fundamental engineering principles they learned as an undergraduate student. After obtaining a given amount of work experience (the length of which is set by state law and may be based on the type of degree received), an EIT/EI may qualify to take the Professional Engineer (PE) exam. Actual licensure can then be applied for and awarded upon successful completion of the PE exam. The standard time of work experience (which may need to be under a Professional Engineer) is four years in most US states, for graduates of an ABET-accredited engineering program.

== Passing rates ==
The NCEES posts passing rates biannually on their website with the following criteria:

- Took the FE exam for the first time
- Attended EAC/ABET-accredited engineering programs
- Took the FE exam within 12 months of graduation

The passing rate based on the criteria spans from 63 to 76 percent as of 2021. The organization also posts complete passing rates annually in their Squared: A Year In Numbers report, which includes all examinees. These reports have been available since 2014.

=== Passing scores ===
The exam results are based on the total number of correct answers with no reductions for wrong answers. A scaled score is converted from the original number of correct answers. Examinees take a unique exam generated from a volunteer-sourced NCEES problem bank. The organization does not publish the passing score because it varies slightly based on the difficulty of the exam. If an examinee does not pass an exam, the organization provides a diagnostic report to help them identify the knowledge areas they need to improve before retaking the exam.

== U.S. Patent Office ==
Passage of the Fundamentals of Engineering Exam, along with graduation with any bachelor's degree or equivalent, satisfies the United States Patent and Trademark Office (USPTO)'s technical requirements for sitting for its registration examination to become either a registered patent attorney or patent agent.
