= Principles and Practice of Engineering exam =

Examination for engineer license in the US

Principles and Practice of Engineering Examination
- Acronym: PE
- Type: Pencil-and-paper exam; Computer-based exam (Select exams only)
- Administrator: National Council of Examiners for Engineering and Surveying
- Skills tested: Analytical reasoning, quantitative reasoning, discipline-specific subjects
- Purpose: Professional licensure
- Year started: 1966
- Duration: 8 hours
- Score range: Pass/Fail
- Offered: Twice annually (April and October); Year-round (Select exams only)
- Regions: United States
- Languages: English
- Prerequisites: Varies per state; generally the examinee must have passed Fundamentals of Engineering Exam and have four years of professional experience.
- Fee: Varies per state
- Used by: Professional state licensing boards
- Website: ncees.org/engineering/pe/

The Principles and Practice of Engineering exam is the examination required for one to become a Professional Engineer (PE) in the United States. It is the second exam required, coming after the Fundamentals of Engineering exam.

Upon passing the PE exam and meeting other eligibility requirements, that vary by state, such as education and experience, an engineer can then become registered in their state to stamp and sign engineering drawings and calculations as a PE.

While the PE itself is sufficient for most engineering fields, some states require a further certification for structural engineers. These require the passing of the Structural I exam and/or the Structural II exam.

The PE Exam is created and scored by the National Council of Examiners for Engineering and Surveying (NCEES). NCEES is a national non-profit organization composed of engineering and surveying licensing boards representing all states and U.S. territories.

== Exam format ==
Exams are offered twice a year, once in April and once in October, and are discipline-specific. With the exception of the Structural exam, each exam is eight hours long, consisting of two 4-hour sessions administered in a single day with a lunch break. There are 40 multiple-choice questions per session. Several disciplines require a common morning breadth exam which broadly covers the discipline and then a more detailed afternoon depth exam where the test taker selects a more detailed area of the discipline. Other disciplines essentially have morning and afternoon breadth exams.

The Structural exam is 16 hours long and administered over two days, with two 4-hour sessions and a lunch break per day. Morning breadth sessions consist of 40 multiple-choice questions, while the afternoon depth sessions require essay responses. An examinee must earn a passing score on both days' exams in order to pass overall, but need not obtain those scores during the same administration of the exam. In computer-based test (CBT) examinees are given access to on-screen reference manuals but for non CBT exams examinees are allowed to carry reference manuals, codes and spirally bided documents.

NCEES began the process of transitioning exams to computer-based testing (CBT) in 2011. NCEES has successfully converted some of the exams and all other NCEES exams are currently in the conversion process and scheduled to launch in computer-based format between now and 2024. Some CBT exams are administered year-round. Other CBT exams that have a smaller examinee population use a different high-stakes testing model and are administered on a single day each year.

== Disciplines ==
PE exams are offered for the following disciplines:

- Agricultural and Biological Engineering (new specifications for the April 2015 exam)
- Architectural
- Chemical
- Civil: Construction (new specifications and design standards for the 2015 exams)
- Civil: Geotechnical (new specifications and design standards for the 2015 exams)
- Civil: Structural (new specifications and design standards for the 2015 exams)
- Civil: Transportation (new specifications and design standards for the 2015 exams)
- Civil: Water Resources and Environmental (new specifications and design standards for the 2015 exams)
- Control Systems
- Electrical and Computer: Computer Engineering (Study Guide: Computer Engineering Compendium)
- Electrical and Computer: Electrical and Electronics
- Electrical and Computer: Power
- Environmental
- Fire Protection
- Industrial
- Mechanical: HVAC and Refrigeration
- Mechanical: Mechanical Systems and Materials
- Mechanical: Thermal and Fluids Systems
- Metallurgical and Materials (new specifications and design standards for the 2015 exams)
- Mining and Mineral Processing
- Naval Architecture and Marine Engineering
- Nuclear
- Petroleum
- Structural(with design standards for the 2015 exams)

Unlike the Fundamentals of Engineering Exam, outside reference sources are allowed for the PE Exam. The general rule is that any such materials must be in some sort of permanent binding (book, three-ring, spiral, etc.); loose papers and notes are prohibited. No writing tools or scratch paper may be brought in, and only calculators specifically approved by NCEES may be used. Examinees are provided with mechanical pencils and may use the test booklet as scratch paper for solving problems.

== Pass rates ==
The PE exam is a professional exam much like the examinations required for public accounting, law, and other professions for which protection of the public is of the utmost concern. Consequently, exam candidates typically spend large amounts of time preparing for the exam. Exam pass rates vary by discipline module and test date, for the April 2010 exam, the pass rates for first time test takers ranged from 85% (Naval Architecture) to 46% (Structural I). The pass rates for repeat test takers is considerably lower.

October 2016 Exam

Exam	First-Time Takers		Repeat Takers	
	Volume	Pass Rate	Volume	Pass Rate
PE Agricultural and Biological (April 2016)	29	72%	5	60%
PE Architectural (April 2016)	86	86%	6	33%
PE Chemical	296	71%	66	32%
PE Civil Construction	742	55%	708	29%
PE Civil Geotechnical	505	63%	295	27%
PE Civil Structural	1347	66%	590	43%
PE Civil Transportation	1421	68%	815	33%
PE Civil Water Resources and Environmental	1430	71%	613	35%
PE Control Systems	229	79%	49	45%
PE Electrical and Computer: Computer Engineering	21	62%	7	29%
PE Electrical and Computer: Electrical and Electronics	104	78%	43	60%
PE Electrical and Computer: Power	1003	66%	509	38%
PE Environmental	242	62%	114	37%
PE Fire Protection	148	64%	72	38%
PE Industrial and Systems (April 2016)	72	78%	15	13%
PE Mechanical HVAC and Refrigeration	495	83%	154	48%
PE Mechanical Mechanical Systems and Materials	553	73%	147	47%
PE Mechanical Thermal and Fluid Systems	643	73%	204	47%
PE Metallurgical and Materials	45	67%	7	57%
PE Mining and Mineral Processing	51	65%	11	27%
PE Naval Architecture and Marine Engineering (April 2016)	56	75%	10	10%
PE Nuclear	25	72%	10	70%
PE Petroleum	192	66%	55	40%
PE Software (April 2016)	9	56%	6	33%

== See also ==
- National Council of Examiners for Engineering and Surveying (NCEES)
- Fundamentals of Engineering Examination (FE exam)
- Graduate Aptitude Test in Engineering (GATE)
- Engineer
- Engineering
- Regulation and licensure in engineering
- Glossary of engineering
- Glossary of civil engineering
- Glossary of electrical and electronics engineering
- Glossary of mechanical engineering
- Glossary of structural engineering
- Glossary of biology
- Glossary of chemistry
- Glossary of economics
- Glossary of physics
- Glossary of probability and statistics
