= National Council of Examiners for Engineering and Surveying =

American non-profit organization

- Formation: 1920
- Type: National non-profit
- Headquarters: Greenville, South Carolina
- Location: United States
- President: Laura Sievers, P.E.
- Website: ncees.org

The National Council of Examiners for Engineering and Surveying (NCEES) is an American non-profit organization dedicated to advancing professional licensure for engineers and surveyors. The Council’s members are the engineering and surveying licensure boards from all 50 U.S. states, the District of Columbia, Guam, Northern Mariana Islands, Puerto Rico and the U.S. Virgin Islands. These boards are divided into four geographic zones: Central, Northeast, Southern, Western. It is headquartered in Greenville, South Carolina.

== Engineering ==
NCEES develops and scores the FE, PE and SE exams for engineering licensure. The FE exam is generally the first step in the process to becoming a professional licensed engineer (PE). It is designed for recent graduates and students who are close to finishing an undergraduate engineering degree from an EAC/ABET- accredited program. The PE exam is designed to test for a minimum level of competency in a particular engineering discipline. It is designed for engineers who have gained a minimum of four years of work experience in their chosen engineering discipline. The PE Structural Engineering exam is predominantly developed to test engineers who practice in jurisdictions that license structural engineers separately from other professional engineers.

- The Fundamentals of Engineering exam (FE exam) is generally the first step in the process to becoming a professional licensed engineer (PE). It is designed for recent graduates and students who are close to finishing an undergraduate engineering degree from an EAC/ABET-accredited program. The FE exam is a computer-based exam administered year-round at NCEES-approved Pearson VUE test centers.
- The Principles and Practice of Engineering Exam (PE exam) tests for a minimum level of competency in a particular engineering discipline. It is designed for engineers who have gained a minimum of four years’ post-college work experience in their chosen engineering discipline.
- The SE Structural Engineering exam tests for a minimum level of competency in structural engineering. It is predominantly developed to test engineers who practice in jurisdictions that license structural engineers separately from other professional engineers. This 16-hour exam uses separate vertical and lateral components to test one's ability to safely design buildings or bridges, especially in areas of high seismicity and high wind.

== Land Surveying ==
NCEES also prepares examinations for land surveyor licensing in the United States. These exams consist of:

- The Fundamentals of Surveying (FS) exam is generally the first step in the process to becoming a professional licensed surveyor (PS). It is designed for recent graduates and students who are close to finishing an undergraduate surveying degree from an ABET accredited program. The FS exam is a computer-based exam administered year-round in testing windows at NCEES-approved Pearson VUE test centers.
- The Principles and Practice of Surveying (PS) exam tests one's ability to practice the surveying profession competently. It is designed for surveyors who have gained at least four years of professional experience.

== Records ==
The NCEES Records program is designed for currently licensed engineers and surveyors who are looking for an easier and faster way to complete the licensure process in multiple jurisdictions, including all 50 states, the District of Columbia, Guam, Puerto Rico, Northern Mariana Islands and the U.S. Virgin Islands. An established NCEES Record will include most—if not all—of the materials one needs to apply for comity licensure in additional states and territories.

== Credentials evaluations ==
NCEES Credentials Evaluations is a service for state licensing boards and applicants. It is designed primarily for candidates who have earned their degrees outside the United States and are pursuing licensure through one of the member licensing boards of NCEES.

== See also ==
- Accreditation Board for Engineering and Technology (ABET)
- Dublin Accord
- Engineering
- Graduate Aptitude Test in Engineering (GATE)
- Regulation and licensure in engineering
- Sydney Accord
- Washington Accord
