= ABET =

Post-secondary accreditation board

Accreditation Board for Engineering and Technology, Incorporated
- Pronunciation: A-bet
- Established: May 10, 1932; 94 years ago
- Headquarters: Baltimore, Maryland, US
- Members: 920 organizations (2023)
- Website: www.abet.org
- Formerly called: American Engineers' Council for Professional Development (ECPD)

ABET (pronounced A-bet), formerly known as the Accreditation Board for Engineering and Technology, Inc., is a non-governmental accreditation organization for post-secondary programs in engineering, engineering technology, computing, and applied and natural sciences.

As of October 2023, ABET had accredited 4,674 programs across 920 organizations in 42 countries. ABET also accredits online educational programs.

== History ==
In 1932, ABET was established as the American Engineers' Council for Professional Development (ECPD). The organization evaluated its first engineering program in 1936, and by 1947, 580 programs had been accredited across 133 institutions.

In 1980, the ECPD changed its name to the Accreditation Board for Engineering and Technology, Inc. In 1985, the organization helped establish the Computing Sciences Accreditation Board (CSAB), one of ABET's largest member societies with over 300 programs. ABET began operating and doing business solely under their acronym in 2005, using “Accreditation Board for Engineering and Technology, Inc.” as their corporate name only when required by law.

== Accreditation process ==
The request for ABET accreditation is initiated by the institution seeking accreditation. Accreditation is given to individual programs rather than to the institution as a whole. Re-evaluation is required every six years. Programs with no previous accreditation can request accreditation if they have produced at least one program graduate.

Each program is assigned to one of four accreditation commissions within ABET based on the title. Each commission has different accreditation criteria:

- Applied and Natural Science Accreditation Commission (ANSAC)
- Computing Accreditation Commission (CAC)
- Engineering Accreditation Commission (EAC)
- Engineering Technology Accreditation Commission (ETAC)

Programs conduct an internal evaluation and complete a self-study report documenting how well the program is meeting established accreditation criteria.

The appropriate ABET commission appoints a team chair to lead the on-campus evaluation visit. The team chair and program evaluators (typically one per program requesting accreditation) are made up of volunteers from academia, government, industry, and private practice. During the visit to the institution, the evaluation team reviews program course materials and interacts with students and faculty, culminating in an exit interview with the dean. Following the team's visit, the institution is given 7 days to address any topics communicated during the exit interview. ABET provides an evaluation statement to the institution, who is given 30 more days to respond to any additional issues.

== Criteria ==
ABET specifies the minimum curriculum requirements for various engineering programs, including a capstone project and a design class. Because of the organization's involvement, engineering curricula are somewhat standardized across the bachelor's level.

== Members ==
ABET is a federation of the following professional and technical member societies representing the fields of applied science, computing, engineering and engineering technology:

- American Academy of Environmental Engineers and Scientists (AAEES)
- American Industrial Hygiene Association (AIHA)
- American Institute of Aeronautics and Astronautics (AIAA)
- American Institute of Chemical Engineers (AIChE)
- American Nuclear Society (ANS)
- American Society of Agricultural and Biological Engineers (ASABE)
- American Society of Civil Engineers (ASCE)
- American Society for Engineering Education (ASEE)
- American Society of Heating, Refrigerating and Air-Conditioning Engineers (ASHRAE)
- American Society of Mechanical Engineers (ASME)
- American Society of Safety Professionals (ASSP)
- American Welding Society (AWS)
- Association for the Advancement of Medical Instrumentation (AAMI)
- Biomedical Engineering Society (BMES)
- Construction Management Association of America (CMAA)
- Computing Sciences Accreditation Board (CSAB)
- Institute of Electrical and Electronics Engineers (IEEE)
- Institute of Industrial and Systems Engineers (IISE)
- International Council on Systems Engineering (INCOSE)
- International Society of Automation (ISA)
- Materials Research Society (MRS)
- National Council of Examiners for Engineering and Surveying (NCEES)
- National Institute of Ceramic Engineers (NICE) of the American Ceramic Society (ACerS)
- National Society of Professional Engineers (NSPE)
- National Society of Professional Surveyors (NSPS)
- SAE International
- Society of Fire Protection Engineers (SFPE)
- Society of Manufacturing Engineers (SME)
- Society for Mining, Metallurgy, and Exploration (SME)
- Society of Naval Architects and Marine Engineers (SNAME)
- Society of Petroleum Engineers (SPE)
- Society of Photo-optical Instrumentation Engineers (SPIE)
- Society of Women Engineers (SWE)
- The Minerals, Metals & Materials Society (TMS)
- Women in Engineering Proactive Network (WEPAN)

== EC 2000 ==
For most of its history, ABET's accreditation criteria specifically outlined the major elements that accredited engineering programs must have, including the program curricula, the faculty type and the facilities. However, in the mid-1990s, the engineering community began to question the appropriateness of such rigid accreditation requirements.

After intense discussion, in 1997, ABET adopted Engineering Criteria 2000 (EC2000). The EC2000 criteria shifted the focus away from the inputs (what material is taught) and to the outputs (what students learned). EC2000 stresses continuous improvement and accounts for specific missions and goals of the individual institutions and programs. The intention of this approach was to enable innovation in engineering programs rather than forcing all programs to conform to a standard, as well as to encourage new assessment processes and program improvements.

== ISO 9000:2015 ==
ABET Accreditation is certified by the International Organization for Standardization. ISO 9000 family of quality management systems standards is designed to help organizations ensure that they meet the needs of customers and other stakeholders while meeting statutory and regulatory requirements related to a product or service.

== Licensing and credentialing ==
To become a licensed professional engineer, one common prerequisite is graduation from an Engineering Accreditation Commission (EAC) of ABET-accredited program. Requirements for professional engineer testing for EAC accredited programs vary from state to state.

The Engineering Credential Evaluation International (ECEI) was established in 1997 as the credential evaluation service of ABET. ECEI specialized in the evaluation of degrees in engineering, engineering technology, computer science and surveying from outside the U.S. As of 30 October 2006, ECEI stopped accepting applications for credentials evaluation; a business decision made by the ABET board of directors.
