= Glossary of civil engineering =

List of definitions of terms and concepts related to civil engineering

This glossary of civil engineering terms is a list of definitions of terms and concepts pertaining specifically to civil engineering, its sub-disciplines, and related fields. For a more general overview of concepts within engineering as a whole, see Glossary of engineering.

== A ==
Abney level
An instrument used in surveying which consists of a fixed sighting tube, a movable spirit level that is connected to a pointing arm, and a protractor scale. An internal mirror allows the user to see the bubble in the level while sighting a distant target. It can be used as a hand-held instrument or mounted on a Jacob's staff for more precise measurement.
Abrams' law

A law which states that the strength of a concrete mix is inversely related to the mass ratio of water to cement. As the water content increases, the strength of the concrete decreases.
abrasion
The process of scuffing, scratching, wearing down, marring, or rubbing away a substance or substrate. It can be intentionally imposed in a controlled process using an abrasive. Abrasion may also be an undesirable effect of exposure to normal use or exposure to the elements.
abrasion resistance
absolute electrode potential
In electrochemistry, according to an IUPAC definition, is the electrode potential of a metal measured with respect to a universal reference system (without any additional metal–solution interface).
absolute pressure
The pressure of a system that is zero-referenced against a perfect vacuum, using an absolute scale, so that it is equal to gauge pressure plus atmospheric pressure.
absolute zero
The theoretical lower limit of the thermodynamic temperature scale, at which the enthalpy and entropy of a cooled ideal gas reach their minimum values, taken as 0. Absolute zero is the point at which the fundamental particles of nature have minimal vibrational motion, retaining only quantum mechanical, zero-point energy-induced particle motion. The theoretical temperature is determined by extrapolating the ideal gas law; by international agreement, absolute zero is taken as −273.15° on the Celsius scale (International System of Units), which equals −459.67° on the Fahrenheit scale (United States customary units or Imperial units). The corresponding Kelvin and Rankine temperature scales set their zero points at absolute zero by definition.
absorbance

In chemistry, the common logarithm of the ratio of incident to transmitted radiant power through a material. Spectral absorbance or spectral decadic absorbance is the common logarithm of the ratio of incident to transmitted spectral radiant power through a material. Absorbance is a dimensionless quantity, and in particular is not a length, though it is a monotonically increasing function of path length, and approaches zero as the path length approaches zero.
abutment
The substructure at either end of a bridge span or dam whereon the structure's superstructure rests or contacts.
AC power
A type of electric power in alternating current circuits, wherein energy storage elements such as inductors and capacitors may result in periodic reversals of the direction of energy flow. Contrast DC power.
acceleration
In physics, the rate of change of velocity of an object with respect to time. An object's acceleration is the net result of any and all forces acting on the object, as described by Newton's second law. The SI unit for acceleration is metre per second squared (m s^{−2}). Accelerations are vector quantities (they have magnitude and direction) and add according to the parallelogram law. As a vector, the calculated net force is equal to the product of the object's mass (a scalar quantity) and its acceleration.
acid
A molecule or ion capable of donating a hydron (proton or hydrogen ion H^{+}), or, alternatively, capable of forming a covalent bond with an electron pair (a Lewis acid).
acid-base reaction
A chemical reaction that occurs between an acid and a base, which can be used to determine pH. Several theoretical frameworks provide alternative conceptions of the reaction mechanisms and their application in solving related problems; these are called the acid–base theories, for example, Brønsted–Lowry acid–base theory.
acid strength
The tendency of an acid, symbolised by the chemical formula HA, to dissociate into a proton, H^{+}, and an anion, A^{−}.
acoustic board
A special kind of board made of sound-absorbing materials, designed to provide sound insulation. Between two outer walls sound-absorbing material is inserted and the wall is porous. Thus, when sound passes through an acoustic board, the intensity of the sound is decreased. The loss of sound energy is typically balanced by the production of heat energy.
acoustics
The branch of physics that deals with the study of all mechanical waves in gases, liquids, and solids including topics such as vibration, sound, ultrasound and infrasound.
activated sludge
A type of wastewater treatment process for treating sewage or industrial wastewaters using aeration and a biological floc composed of bacteria and protozoa.
activated sludge model
A generic name for a group of mathematical methods to model activated sludge systems. The research in this area is coordinated by a task group of the International Water Association (IWA). Activated sludge models are used in scientific research to study biological processes in hypothetical systems. They can also be applied on full scale wastewater treatment plants for optimisation, when carefully calibrated with reference data for sludge production and nutrients in the effluent.
active transport
In cellular biology, the movement of molecules across a membrane from a region of their lower concentration to a region of their higher concentration—against the concentration gradient. Active transport requires cellular energy to achieve this movement. There are two types of active transport: primary active transport that uses ATP, and secondary active transport that uses an electrochemical gradient.
actuator
A mechanism by which a control system acts upon an environment. The control system can be simple (a fixed mechanical or electronic system), software-based (e.g. a printer driver, robot control system), a human, or any other input.
acute angle
An angle that is smaller than a right angle, i.e. less than 90 degrees. See also obtuse angle.
adhesion
The tendency of dissimilar particles or surfaces to cling to one another (cohesion refers to the tendency of similar or identical particles/surfaces to cling to one another). The forces that cause adhesion and cohesion can be divided into several types. The intermolecular forces responsible for the function of various kinds of stickers and sticky tape fall into the categories of chemical adhesion, dispersive adhesion, and diffusive adhesion. In addition to the cumulative magnitudes of these intermolecular forces, there are also certain emergent mechanical effects.
adiabatic process
In thermodynamics, an adiabatic process is one that occurs without transfer of heat or mass of substances between a thermodynamic system and its surroundings. In an adiabatic process, energy is transferred to the surroundings only as work. The adiabatic process provides a rigorous conceptual basis for the theory used to expound the first law of thermodynamics, and as such it is a key concept in thermodynamics.
aerobic digestion
A process in sewage treatment designed to reduce the volume of sewage sludge and make it suitable for subsequent use. More recently, technology has been developed that allows the treatment and reduction of other organic waste, such as food, cardboard and horticultural waste.
aerodynamics
The study of the motion of air, particularly its interactions with solid objects such as airplane wings. Aerodynamics is a sub-field of fluid dynamics and gas dynamics, and many aspects of aerodynamics theory are common to these fields.
afocal system
In optics, an optical system without focus, i.e. one that produces no net convergence or divergence of a beam of light, and which therefore has an infinite effective focal length.
agricultural engineering
The engineering discipline that studies agricultural production and processing. Agricultural engineering combines the disciplines of mechanical, civil, electrical and chemical engineering principles with a knowledge of agricultural principles according to technological principles. A key goal of this discipline is to improve the efficacy and sustainability of agricultural practices.
albedo
A measure of the diffuse reflection of solar radiation out of the total solar radiation received by an astronomical body (e.g. a planet like Earth). It is dimensionless and measured on a scale from 0 (corresponding to a black body that absorbs all incident radiation) to 1 (corresponding to a body that reflects all incident radiation).
algebra
A broad area of mathematics, together with number theory, geometry and analysis. In its most general form, algebra is the study of mathematical symbols and the rules for manipulating these symbols; it is a unifying thread of almost all of mathematics. It includes everything from elementary equation solving to the study of abstractions such as groups, rings, and fields. The more basic parts of algebra are called elementary algebra; the more abstract parts are called abstract algebra or modern algebra. Elementary algebra is generally considered to be essential for any study of mathematics, science, or engineering, as well as such applications as medicine and economics. Abstract algebra is a major area in advanced mathematics, studied primarily by professional mathematicians.
algorithm
An unambiguous specification of how to solve a class of problems. Algorithms can perform calculation, data processing and automated reasoning tasks.
alkane

In organic chemistry, an acyclic saturated hydrocarbon. In other words, an alkane consists of hydrogen and carbon atoms arranged in a tree structure in which all the carbon–carbon bonds are single. Alkanes have the general chemical formula C_{n}H_{2n+2}.
alkene
In organic chemistry, an unsaturated hydrocarbon that contains at least one carbon–carbon double bond.
alkyne
In organic chemistry, an unsaturated hydrocarbon containing at least one carbon—carbon triple bond.
alloy
A combination of metals or of a metal and another element. Alloys are defined by a metallic bonding character.
alternating current (AC)
A type of electric current which periodically reverses direction, in contrast to direct current (DC) which flows only in one direction. Alternating current is the form in which electric power is delivered to businesses and residences, and it is the form of electrical energy that consumers typically use when they plug kitchen appliances, televisions, fans and electric lamps into a wall socket. A common source of DC power is a battery cell in a flashlight. The abbreviations AC and DC are often used to mean simply alternating and direct, as when they modify current or voltage.
ammeter
A measuring instrument used to measure the current in a circuit.
amino acid
A class of organic compound containing amine (-NH_{2}) and carboxyl (-COOH) functional groups, along with a side chain (R group) specific to each amino acid. The key elements of an amino acid are carbon (C), hydrogen (H), oxygen (O), and nitrogen (N), although other elements are found in the side chains of certain amino acids.
amorphous solid

In condensed matter physics and materials science, a solid that lacks the long-range order that is characteristic of a crystal.
ampere
often shortened to "amp", is the base unit of electric current in the International System of Units (SI). It is named after André-Marie Ampère (1775–1836), French mathematician and physicist, considered the father of electrodynamics.
amphoterism
In chemistry, an amphoteric compound is a molecule or ion that can react both as an acid and as a base. Many metals (such as copper, zinc, tin, lead, aluminium, and beryllium) form amphoteric oxides or hydroxides. Amphoterism depends on the oxidation states of the oxide. Al_{2}O_{3} is an example of an amphoteric oxide.
amplifier
An electronic device that can increase the power of a signal (a time-varying voltage or current). It is a two-port electronic circuit that uses electric power from a power supply to increase the amplitude of a signal applied to its input terminals, producing a proportionally greater amplitude signal at its output. The amount of amplification provided by an amplifier is measured by its gain: the ratio of output voltage, current, or power to input. An amplifier is a circuit that has a power gain greater than one.
amplitude
anaerobic digestion
angular acceleration
The rate of change of angular velocity. In three dimensions, it is a pseudovector. In SI units, it is measured in radians per second squared (rad/s^{2}), and is usually denoted by the Greek letter alpha (α).
Anion
is an ion with more electrons than protons, giving it a net negative charge (since electrons are negatively charged and protons are positively charged).
annealing
anode
ANSI
Archimedes' principle
states that the upward buoyant force that is exerted on a body immersed in a fluid, whether fully or partially submerged, is equal to the weight of the fluid that the body displaces and acts in the upward direction at the center of mass of the displaced fluid. Archimedes' principle is a law of physics fundamental to fluid mechanics. It was formulated by Archimedes of Syracuse.
architecture
The process and the product of planning, designing, and constructing buildings or any other structures. Architectural works, in the material form of buildings, are often perceived as cultural symbols and as works of art. Historical civilizations are often identified with their surviving architectural achievements.
architectural engineering

The application of engineering principles and technology to building design and construction.
Arrhenius equation
atom
austenitization
automation
The technology by which a process or procedure is performed with minimal human assistance. Automation or automatic control is the use of various control systems for operating equipment such as machinery, processes in factories, boilers and heat treating ovens, switching on telephone networks, steering and stabilization of ships, aircraft and other applications and vehicles with minimal or reduced human intervention.
automaton
Any self-operating machine, or a machine or control mechanism designed to automatically follow a predetermined sequence of operations, or respond to predetermined instructions.
autonomous vehicle

== B ==
balance sheet

In financial accounting, a summary of the financial balances of an individual or organization, whether it be a sole proprietorship, a business partnership, a corporation, private limited company or other organization such as a government or not-for-profit entity. Assets, liabilities and ownership equity are listed as of a specific date, such as the end of its financial year. A balance sheet is often described as a "snapshot of a company's financial condition". Of the four basic financial statements, the balance sheet is the only statement which applies to a single point in time of a business' calendar year.
barometer
A scientific instrument used to measure air pressure.
battery
A device consisting of one or more electrochemical cells with external connections provided to power electrical devices such as flashlights, mobile phones, and electric cars. When a battery is supplying electric power, its positive terminal is the cathode and its negative terminal is the anode. The terminal marked negative is the source of electrons that will flow through an external electric circuit to the positive terminal. When a battery is connected to an external electric load, a redox reaction converts high-energy reactants to lower-energy products, and the free-energy difference is delivered to the external circuit as electrical energy. Historically the term "battery" specifically referred to a device composed of multiple cells, however the usage has evolved to include devices composed of a single cell.
base
beam
A structural element that primarily resists loads applied laterally to its axis. Its mode of deflection is primarily by bending. The loads applied to the beam result in reaction forces at the beam's support points. The total effect of all the forces acting on the beam is to produce shear forces and bending moments within the beam, which in turn induce internal stresses, strains and deflections of the beam. Beams are characterized by their manner of support, profile (shape of cross-section), length, and material.
Beer–Lambert law
belt
belt friction
bending
benefit–cost analysis
bending moment
The reaction induced in a structural element when an external force or moment is applied to the element causing the element to bend.
Bernoulli differential equation
Bernoulli's equation
Bernoulli's principle
In fluid dynamics, Bernoulli's principle states that an increase in the speed of a fluid occurs simultaneously with a decrease in pressure or a decrease in the fluid's potential energy. The principle is only applicable for isentropic flows: when the effects of irreversible processes (like turbulence) and non-adiabatic processes (e.g. heat radiation) are small and can be neglected.
beta particle
block and tackle
boiling point
boiling-point elevation
Boltzmann constant
boson
Boyle's law
Bravais lattice
Brayton cycle
break-even analysis
Brewster's angle
brittleness
A physical property of a material such that, when subjected to stress, it breaks without significant plastic deformation. Brittle materials absorb relatively little energy prior to fracture, even those of high strength.
Brownian motion
bulk modulus
A measure of how resistant to compression a substance is, defined as the ratio of the infinitesimal pressure increase to the resulting relative decrease in volume. It is one of three standard moduli used to describe a material's response to stress, along with the shear modulus and Young's modulus.
buoyancy

== C ==
calculus
The mathematical study of continuous change.
capacitance
The ratio of the change in an electric charge in a system to the corresponding change in its electric potential.
capillary action

The ability of a liquid to flow in narrow spaces without the assistance of, or even in opposition to, external forces like gravity.
casting
center of gravity
center of mass
center of pressure
central force motion
centripetal force
chain reaction
Charles's law
circular motion
civil engineering
The professional engineering discipline that deals with the design, construction, and maintenance of the physical and naturally built environment, including public works such as roads, bridges, railways, canals, dams, airports, sewage systems, pipelines, structural components of buildings, and infrastructure for civic utilities.
Clausius–Clapeyron relation
Clausius inequality
Clausius theorem
coastal engineering
coefficient of performance
coefficient of variation
coherence
cohesion
compensation
compressive strength
computational fluid dynamics
computer-aided design (CAD)
computer-aided engineering
computer-aided manufacturing
construction engineering
construction surveying
control engineering
control systems engineering
corrosion
crystallization
crystallography
curvilinear motion

== D ==
Dalton's law

In chemistry and physics, a law which states that in a mixture of non-reacting gases, the total pressure exerted is equal to the sum of the partial pressures of the individual gases. This empirical law was first observed by John Dalton in 1801 and published in 1802, and is closely related to the ideal gas laws.
damped vibration
Darcy–Weisbach equation
DC motor
decibel
definite integral
deflection
deformation (engineering)
deformation (mechanics)
degrees of freedom
delta robot
delta-wye transformer
density
derivative
design engineer
An engineer whose profession focuses on the engineering design process in any of the various disciplines of engineering, e.g. civil engineering. Design engineers tend to work on products and systems that involve adapting and using complex scientific and mathematical techniques in order to develop solutions for human society.
differential pulley
dispersion
displacement (fluid)
displacement (vector)
Doppler effect
drag
ductility
dynamics
dyne

== E ==
earthquake engineering
elastic modulus
elasticity
electric charge
electric circuit
electric current
electric displacement field
electric generator
electric field
electric field gradient
electric motor
electric potential
electrical potential energy
electric power
electrical and electronics engineering
electrical conductor
electrical insulator
electrical network
Any interconnection of electrical components (e.g. batteries, resistors, inductors, capacitors, switches, etc.), or a model of such an interconnection consisting of electrical elements (e.g. voltage sources, current sources, resistances, inductances, and capacitances).
electrical resistance
electrodynamics
electromagnet
electromagnetic field
electromechanics
electronegativity
electronics
endothermic
engine
engineering
engineering economics
engineering ethics
environmental engineering
engineering physics

The study of the combined disciplines of physics, mathematics and engineering, particularly computer, nuclear, electrical, electronic, materials or mechanical engineering. By focusing on the scientific method as a rigorous basis, it seeks ways to apply, design, and develop new solutions in engineering.
estimator
Euler–Bernoulli beam equation
exothermic

== F ==
falling bodies
farad
faraday
Faraday constant
Fermat's principle
finite element method
fission
fluid
fluid mechanics
fluid physics
fluid statics
flywheel
A mechanical device which uses the conservation of angular momentum to store rotational energy. Flywheels are therefore a type of accumulator, analogous to electrical inductors, in that they store energy for later use. They are commonly used to smooth deviations in the power output of an energy source, to deliver stored energy at rates that exceed the ability of the energy source, and to control the orientation of mechanical systems.
focus
foot-pound
fracture toughness
free fall
frequency modulation
freezing point
friction
function
fundamental frequency
fundamental interaction
fundamental theorem of calculus
fusion

== G ==
galvanic cell
gas
Geiger counter
general relativity
geometric mean
geophysics
geotechnical engineering
gluon
Graham's law of diffusion
gravitation
gravitational constant
gravitational energy
gravitational potential
gravity
ground state

== H ==
half-life
haptic
hardness
harmonic mean
heat
heat transfer
height above ground level
Helmholtz free energy
Henderson–Hasselbalch equation
Henry's law
Hertz
hoist
horsepower
housewrap

A synthetic material used to insulate and protect buildings. Housewrap functions as a weather-resistant barrier, preventing rain from getting into the wall assembly while allowing water vapor to pass to the exterior. If moisture from either direction is allowed to build up within stud or cavity walls, mold and rot can set in and fiberglass or cellulose insulation will lose its R-value due to heat-conducting moisture. House wrap may also serve as an air barrier if it is sealed carefully at seams.
Huygens–Fresnel principle
hydraulic engineering
hydraulics

== I ==
ice point
ideal gas
ideal gas constant
ideal gas law
inclinometer
indefinite integral
inertia
infrasound
integral
integral transform
International System of Units
interval estimation
ion
ionic bond
ionization
impedance
inclined plane
industrial engineering
inorganic chemistry
invert level
isotope

== J ==
joule (J)
The derived unit of energy in the International System of Units. It is equal to the energy transferred to (or work done on) an object when a force of one newton acts on that object in the direction of its motion through a distance of one metre (1 newton metre or N⋅m). It is also the energy dissipated as heat when an electric current of one ampere passes through a resistance of one ohm for one second. It is named after the English physicist James Prescott Joule (1818–1889).

== K ==
Kalman filter
kelvin
kinematics
Kirchhoff's circuit laws
Kirchhoff's equations

== L ==
laminar flow
Laplace transform
LC circuit
lever
L'Hôpital's rule
linear actuator
linear elasticity

== M ==
Mach number
machine
machine element
Maclaurin series
magnetic field
magnetism
manufacturing engineering
mass balance
mass density
mass moment of inertia
material properties
materials science
mathematical optimization
mathematical physics
matrix
Maxwell's equations
measures of central tendency
mechanical advantage
mechanical engineering
mechanical filter
mechanical wave
mechanics
mechanism
metal alloy
mid-range
midhinge
mining engineering
Miller indices
mobile robot
modulus of elasticity
molding
molecular physics
moment of inertia
multibody system
multidisciplinary design optimization

== N ==
nanoengineering
nanotechnology
Navier–Stokes equations
Newtonian fluid
nth root
nuclear engineering
nuclear power

== O ==
obvert
ohm
Ohm's law
optics

== P ==
parallel circuit
parity (mathematics)
parity (physics)
paraffin
Pascal's Law
pendulum
petroleum engineering
pH
phase (matter)
phase
phase equilibrium
physical chemistry
physical quantity
physics
plasma physics
plasticity
pneumatics
point estimation
polyphase system
power (electric)
power (physics)
power factor
pressure
probability
probability distribution
probability theory
pulley

== R ==
raised floor
regelation
relative density
relative velocity
reliability engineering
Reynolds number
rheology
rigid body
robotics
root-mean-square
root-mean-square speed
rotational energy
rotational speed

== S ==
sanitary engineering
saturated compound
scalar (mathematics)
scalar (physics)
scalar multiplication
screw
series circuit
servo
servomechanism
shadow matter
shear strength
shear stress
shortwave radiation
SI units
signal processing
simple machine
siphon
solid mechanics
solid-state physics
solid solution strengthening
solubility
sound
special relativity
specific heat
specific gravity
specific volume
specific weight
spontaneous combustion
state of matter
statics
statistics
Stefan–Boltzmann law
Stewart platform
stiffness
stoichiometry
strain
strain hardening
strength of materials
stress
stress–strain analysis
stress–strain curve
structural analysis
structural engineering
structural load
sublimation
subsumption architecture
surface tension
superconductor
superhard material
surveying

== T ==
technical standard
An established norm or requirement for a repeatable technical task, especially when written in a formal document that establishes uniform criteria, methods, processes, and practices. A technical standard may be developed privately or unilaterally by edict, or by groups such as trade associations, industry standards organizations, or governments, often according to the formal consensus of experts in the discipline.
temperature
tensile force
tensile modulus
tensile strength
tensile testing
tension member
thermal conduction
thermal equilibrium
thermal radiation
thermodynamics
Thévenin's theorem
three-phase
torque
torsional vibration
toughness
trajectory
transducer
transportation engineering
trimean
triple point
Trouton's rule
truncated mean
truss
An assembly of two-force structural members such as beams, connected at nodes, where the members are organized such that the assemblage as a whole behaves as a single, rigid object.
turbine
turbomachinery
turbulence

== U ==
ultimate tensile strength (UTS)

The maximum stress that a material under tension can withstand while being stretched or pulled before breaking. Ultimate tensile strength is usually found by performing a tensile test and recording the stress versus strain; the highest point of the stress–strain curve is the ultimate tensile strength. Tensile strengths are often important in the design of brittle members. Contrast compressive strength.
uncertainty principle
Unicode
unit vector
unsaturated compound
urban engineering
utility frequency
The nominal frequency of the oscillations of alternating current (AC) in a wide area synchronous grid transmitted from a power station to an end-user. In much of the world the utility frequency is standardized at 50 Hz, although in the Americas and parts of Asia it is typically 60 Hz.

== V ==
vacuum
valve
van der Waals equation
van der Waals force
van 't Hoff equation
van 't Hoff factor
Venturi effect
vibration
viscoelasticity
viscosity
volt-ampere
volt-ampere reactive
Volta potential
voltage
volumetric flow rate
von Mises yield criterion

== W ==
wastewater engineering
watt (W)
wave
wavelength
wedge
weighted mean
wet-bulb temperature
wheel and axle
winsorized mean

== X ==
X-coordinate

== Y ==
Y-coordinate
yield
Young's modulus

== Z ==
Zero Defects (ZD)
A management-led program to eliminate defects in industrial production that enjoyed brief popularity in American industry from 1964 to the early 1970s. Quality expert Philip Crosby later incorporated it into his "Absolutes of Quality Management" and it enjoyed a renaissance in the American automobile industry—as a performance goal more than as a program—in the 1990s. Although applicable to any type of enterprise, it has been primarily adopted within supply chains wherever large volumes of components are being purchased (common items such as nuts and bolts are good examples).
zeroth law of thermodynamics
States that if two thermodynamic systems are each in thermal equilibrium with a third one, then they are in thermal equilibrium with each other. Accordingly, thermal equilibrium between systems is a transitive relation. Two systems are said to be in the relation of thermal equilibrium if they are linked by a wall permeable only to heat and they do not change over time. As a convenience of language, systems are sometimes also said to be in a relation of thermal equilibrium if they are not linked so as to be able to transfer heat to each other, but would still not do so (even) if they were connected by a wall permeable only to heat.

== See also ==
- Glossary of engineering
- Glossary of mechanical engineering
- Glossary of structural engineering
- Glossary of prestressed concrete terms
- Glossary of architecture
- Glossary of physics
- National Council of Examiners for Engineering and Surveying
- Fundamentals of Engineering Examination
- Principles and Practice of Engineering Examination
- Graduate Aptitude Test in Engineering
