= Glossary of prestressed concrete terms =

This page is a glossary of Prestressed concrete terms.

== A ==
actual extension
See measured extension.
anchor
anchorage
A rigid component, commonly constructed of cast iron, located at the end of a tendon and that directly transfers a tendon's force to the surrounding concrete.
anchor block
A rigid, usually circular, component placed over a bundle of prestressing strands at the end of a tendon, and that transfers the strand forces directly to the anchor component via tapered wedges located within its internal conical recess.
anchor centreline height
The positional dimension setting the height of an end-anchorage, usually measured vertically up from the formwork surface to the mid-depth of the anchor component.
anchor friction
The loss of prestressing force in the tendons due to friction generated by the strands sliding against the anchorage assembly during the tensioning operations.
anchor recess
A formwork blockout or recess former fitted to the edge formwork of a post-tensioned concrete member, and that creates a temporary void space external to the prestressing anchor to allow the anchor block or similar to be fitted after formwork stripping.
anchor set
See wedge set.
anchorage assembly
An assembly of components located at the end of a tendon and commonly comprising any employed combination of the anchor, anchor block, banana block, barrels, wedges, ducting transition, grouting tubes and anti-burst reinforcement.
anchorage zone
The region at the end of a tendon in the immediate vicinity of the anchorage, in which the most concentrated force transfer occurs between the anchor and the surrounding concrete.
anti-burst reinforcement
Unstressed reinforcement provided in the anchorage zones around individual tendons and/or grouped anchorages, which resists the secondary stresses created in the concrete from the applied prestressing forces.

== B ==
banana
banana block
A short, curved anchor block sometimes fitted to a mono-strand stressed tendon, and that transfers the strand forces to the anchor via tapered wedges located within its internal conical recesses.
bar
See threaded bar.
barrel
A cylindrical component fitted over a single prestressing strand at an anchorage, and that transfers the strand force to the anchor via tapered wedges located within its internal conical recess. A set of barrels can be used with a mono-strand stressed tendon as an alternative to an anchor block.
block
See anchor block.
bond
The adhesion of concrete or grout to prestressing strands, wires or bars, or to unstressed reinforcement, either through friction or mechanical interlock.
bond strength
The resistance to separation of hardened concrete or grout from prestressing strands, wires or bars, or from unstressed reinforcement. Typically measured in the same units as concrete compressive strength.
bonded length
The length of that part of a prestressing tendon that is, or is to be, bonded to the surrounding concrete, either directly or via internal grouting of the tendon's ducting.
bonded tendon
bonded prestressing
A prestressing tendon that is, or is to be, permanently connected to the surrounding concrete along the full length between its end anchorages. Such connection may be directly, or via internal grouting of the tendon's ducting.
bripak
A portable frame structure commonly employed on site to support coils of prestressing strand and to facilitate the safe unloading of continuous lengths of strand into tendons or ducting.
bursting stresses
Localised stresses produced by prestressing forces in the anchorage zone of a prestressed member, and that tend to promote tensile rupture in the region immediately inboard of the anchorage.

== C ==
cable
See tendon.
cable stay
See stay cable.
circular prestressing
An arrangement of prestressing where the tendons form partial or full sections of (usually horizontal and circular) arcs between end anchorages. Commonly used for the prestressing of tanks, silos and pipes.
conventional reinforcement
See unstressed reinforcement.
coupler
A rigid component, commonly constructed from cast iron, which is located at the end of a tendon and transfers the tendon force from the end of one tendon segment to another.
cut-off
See tendon cut-off.

== D ==
de-bond
Prevent the bond of a prestressing tendon to the surrounding concrete.
de-bonded length
The length of that part of a prestressing tendon that is to remain permanently unbonded from the surrounding concrete.
dead end anchorage
A "passive" end anchorage of a prestressing tendon that does not have any jacking operations undertaken at that end.
de-stress
To release the prestressing forces within a tendon, usually in a controlled manner.
deviation point
deviator
A device or structural element that permanently deviates a tendon's profile at a location, for the purposes of producing a reactionary force against the concrete when the tendon is stressed. Used in pre-tensioned elements, and in external prestressing.
drape
See tendon drape.
draped tendon
Tendons that are profiled predominately to a curved profile between support points.
draw-in
See wedge draw-in.
duct
ducting
Encapsulating tube-like component, usually constructed from galvanised steel or polythene, which creates a void space within the concrete and surrounds the strands, wires or bar of a post-tensioned tendon.
duct chair
See tendon chair.
duct friction
The stress loss in a prestressing tendon resulting from friction between the tendon and duct during tensioning.
duct joiner
A component that securely connects separate segments of post tensioning ducting, commonly used when joining precast concrete segments in a prestressed structure.
dummy strand
A short length of prestressing strand pre-installed into ducting during concreting to maintain duct integrity. Occasionally used at some jointing arrangements.

== E ==
eccentricity
The distance between the centre of gravity of the concrete cross-section and the centroid of its prestressing element(s), at any point along the member.
elastic modulus
See Young's Modulus.
elongation
See tendon extension.
end block
An end section of a prestressed member that houses one or more anchorage assemblies, and is often locally enlarged to reduce the applied anchorage stresses.
extension
See tendon extension.
external post-tensioning
Post-tensioning comprising tendons placed externally to the concrete structure, but connected to it at the end anchorages and profile-deviation points.

== F ==
final stress
The final tensioning operation undertaken during post-tensioning, resulting in the design prestress level being established within the member.
flat duct
Ducting with an oval or "stadium" cross sectional shape. Such ducting is usually extruded (if plastic), or constructed from flat metal strip folded and joined with a longitudinal seam. Commonly used for mono-strand bonded tendons.
flat tendon
A prestressing tendon installed with no vertical or horizontal curvature. It forms a straight line between end anchorages.
friction loss
The loss of prestressing force in a tendon resulting from all frictional sources. The total friction loss in a tendon is the sum of duct friction loss and anchor friction loss.
full prestressing
Prestressing to a stress level such that, under design loads, no tensile stresses exist in the precompressed tensile zone of the member. Can be compared to partial prestressing.

== G ==
grouting
The process of filling post-tensioning ducts with grout after tensioning.
grout tube
Tubular components connected to anchors or ducting through which grout is pumped and/or air is bled, during the process of grouting.

== H ==
harped tendon
Tendons that are profiled predominately having lengths of straight tendon between points of significant angular deviation. Commonly employed in pre-tensioned elements, where the angular deviations are created by hold-down points in the casting bed.
high point
See tendon high point.
hoop tendon
A horizontally-curved tendon forming part or all of a circle, typically installed in vertically-spaced layers up the height of a prestressed tank or silo to resist hoop tensions generated by the stored contents.

== I ==
initial stress
The first tensioning operation undertaken during post-tensioning, typically applied as soon as the concrete at the anchorage locations has attained sufficient strength to resist the resulting anchorage zone stresses.

== J ==
jack
See stressing jack.
jack ram
The active hydraulic cylinder of a stressing jack, being the cylinder that extends from the body of the jack as the tendon strain increases.
jacking force
The prestressing force applied by the stressing jack to the tendons during tensioning.

== L ==
lift-off load
The force required to be applied to an already-tensioned anchor block to lift it free of its associated anchor or bearing plate. This value represents the magnitude of prestressing force within the tendon at that point in time.
live end anchorage
A "active end anchorage of a prestressing tendon that has jacking operations undertaken at that end.
load balancing
A prestressed concrete design method in which the prestressing forces exerted upon the member act to balance a given proportion of the service loads that the member will be subjected to.
longitudinal prestressing
Prestressing forces acting along the longitudinal axis of the member.
low point
See tendon low point.

== M ==
Macalloy bar
See threaded bar.
measured extension
The measured tendon elongation produced by tensioning operations on that tendon.
minimum prestress level
The (generally long-term) minimum level of residual prestressing stress within a member following tensioning and the actions of all time-dependent losses.
mono-strand
A prestressing system utilising tendons with single strands, or tendons able to be tensioned using a mono-strand jack.
mono-strand jack
A tensioning jack that applies force to a single tendon strand at a time.
multi-strand
A prestressing system utilising tendons with multiple strands, and are tensioned using a multi-strand jack.
multi-strand jack
A tensioning jack that applies force to a more than one tendon strand at a time.

== O ==
offset
The eccentricity within a post-tensioning tendon between the centreline of the duct component and the centreline of the strand bundle.
onion dead end
A form of dead-end anchorage utilising strand "onions" or "bulbs" on the ends of each prestressing strand.

== P ==
P/A level
The level of compressive stress present within an element due to prestressing forces. Derived from the prestressing force at that location divided by the cross-sectional area.
partial prestressing
Prestressing to a stress level such that, under design loads, tensile stresses are allowed to exist in the pre-compressed tensile zone of the member. Can be compared to full prestressing.
preload
A quantity of initial prestressing force applied to a tendon or structural element, prior to subsequent operations being undertaken.
pre-tensioning
pre-tensioned
A method of prestressing concrete where the tendons are tensioned before the concrete is placed.
post-tensioning
post-tensioned
A method of prestressing concrete where the tendons are tensioned after the concrete has attained a specified minimum strength or age.
prestress level
The level of compressive stress created within a prestressed concrete member as a result of prestressing.
Prestressed concrete
The introduction of internal stresses into structural concrete via tensioned tendons, to reduce potential tensile stresses in the concrete from applied loads.
primary grouting
The first, or only, stage of grouting for post-tensioned tendons. Multiple stages of grouting may be employed for doubly-encapsulated tendons such as re-stressable ground anchors.
profile
See tendon profile.
profiled tendon
A tendon that has been draped or harped to give it a non-flat profile between end anchorages.
pump
A device to provide hydraulic pressure for the operation of stressing jacks. Also a device to provide a supply of pressurised grout for the grouting of bonded tendons.

== R ==
ram
See jack ram.
re-stressable
A prestressing tendon that can be re-tensioned, often permanently, following having been tensioned to its full design load.
round duct
Ducting with a circular cross sectional shape. Such ducting is usually extruded (if plastic), or constructed from flat metal strip helically-wound with a continuous helical seam. Common;ly used for multi-strand bonded and unbonded tendons.

== S ==
secondary grouting
A second stage grouting operation for post-tensioned tendons, following the primary grouting of the duct. Usually associated with doubly-encapsulated tendons such as re-stressable ground anchors.
sheathing
material encasing prestressing steel in unbonded tendons to prevent it bonding to the surrounding concrete, to contain the anti-corrosion coating on the steel, and to provide corrosion protection.
spalling stresses
Localised stresses produced by prestressing forces in the anchorage zone of a prestressed member, which tend to promote tensile rupture in the region(s) midway between spaced anchorages.
stay cable
An external, double-encapsulated, unbonded tendon of bundled strands or wires, used for the support of deck structures on cable-stayed bridges.
stool
See stressing stool.
strand
High-strength (usually) steel wires wound helically around a centre wire, typically in a 7-wire arrangement.
strand bundle
The collection of prestressing strands within a single multi-strand tendon.
strand onion
A permanent deformation in the wires of a strand at one end, resulting in an open "bulb" arrangement of the wires so as to permit enhanced bonding of the strand
strand pusher
A device to forcefully push prestressing strand, utilised in the installation of strand into the ducting of post-tensioning tendons.
strand shears
A device, often hydraulic, to sever the excess length of strand protruding from an anchorage following tensioning.
stressing
See tensioning.
stressing jack
A device that tensions prestressed concrete tendons.
stressing stool
A device interposed between the stressing jack and the concrete member during tensioning operations, to allow manipulation of the anchor block and seating wedges. Often used during lift-off testing.
swage
A sturdy fitting surrounding a strand clamped onto the strand by compressive deformation. Once fitted, the force required to move the swage along the strand should be greater than the strand's breaking load.
swaged dead end
A form of dead-end anchorage utilising swages placed on each strand of the tendon, with all swages bearing onto a common dead-end bearing plate.

== T ==
tendon
A complete assembly of a prestressing element, comprising one or more tensioned elements (bar, strand, wire, etc) that apply compression to surrounding concrete, along with any associated components such as ducting, anchorages, etc required to enclose and anchor these tensioned elements.
tendon chair
A component that positions and hold a tendon above the concrete formwork to make it comply with its required profile.
tendon cut-off
tendon cutting
The removal of excess tendon length from the end of a tendon following tensioning and lock-off.
tendon drape
The magnitude of vertical curvature of a profiled tendon between any two high points of its profile, usually given as the averaged vertical distance to the low point from the high points.
tendon elongation
tendon extension
The increase in length of a prestressing tendon due to the application of tensioning force.
tendon height
The vertical distance of a tendon from the member's soffit formwork. Usually measured to the underside of the duct or sheathing.
tendon high point
The maximum height of a tendon's profile (usually) over a support location, such a column, wall, pier, etc. Usually measured from the concrete soffit formwork to the underside of the tendon duct or sheathing.
tendon length
The distance between end anchorages of a tendon.
tendon low point
The minimum height of a tendon's profile between two consecutive high points, or high point and end anchorage, and commonly occurring in the midspan region of the element. Usually measured from the concrete soffit formwork to the underside of the tendon duct or sheathing..
tendon number
The identifying number given to a specific tendon within the set of tendons installed into the structure.
tendon profile
The physical path taken by a tendon between its end anchorages.
tendon spacing
The distance, horizontally or vertically as appropriate, between individual tendons within a set of parallel tendons when installed. Usually measured between tendon centrelines.
tendon termination
termination
The intentional severing and remediation of an already-installed and stressed post-tensioned tendon, such as to allow modifications to be made to an existing prestressed structure.
theoretical extension
The calculated tendon elongation predicted to result from stressing operations on that tendon.
threaded bar
A long, slender structural element, usually made from continuously threaded high-strength steel, and employed as a prestressing tendon.
time dependent losses
The loss of force in a prestressing tendon that occurs over time as the result of shrinkage, creep and relaxation actions.
transfer length
The distance required to fully transfer the bonded tendon's prestressing force to the surrounding concrete solely by bond.
transfer strength
The concrete compressive strength required to be achieved before force can be applied to the member from the jacking system.
transverse prestressing
Prestressing forces acting transversely to the longitudinal axis of the member.

== U ==
unbonded tendon
unbonded prestressing
A tendon in which the tensioned element (strand, wire, etc) is unbonded from, and permanently free to move relative to, the surrounded concrete.
unstressed reinforcement
Bars, wires, strands, fibres or similar elements directly embedded into the concrete matrix such that they resist forces applied to it.

== V ==
vertical prestressing
Prestressing forces acting in the vertical direction, or along the vertical axis of the member. Often employed in prestressed tanks, cores and tensioned columns.

== W ==
wedge
wedges
Tapered high-strength steel component(s) with internal serrations that grip and hold prestressing strands during and after tensioning. Two or more wedges are placed around a strand and compress onto it as they are drawn into conical recesses in the anchorage during jack retraction.
wedge draw-in
wedge set
The movement of the anchorage wedges within the conical seating recesses of the anchor block or barrel during release of the jacking ram at the completion of tensioning. Such movement occurs as the strand load(s) is progressively transferred from the jack to the anchor, and results in a reduction in the prestressing force finally applied to the member.
wire
steel prestressing wire made from hot-rolled rods that is cold-drawn through dies to increase its strength.
wobble
Unintended angular deviations in a tendon's profile, resulting in additional friction losses during tensioning.

== Y ==
yield strength
The stress at which a material exhibits a specific limiting deviation from the proportionality of stress to strain.
Young's modulus
A mechanical property of linear-elastic solid materials that defines the relationship between stress and strain in the material.

== See also ==
- Cable-stayed bridge
- Cantilever bridge
- Concrete
- Concrete beam
- Concrete slab
- Construction
- Glossary of engineering
- Glossary of civil engineering
- Glossary of structural engineering
- Incremental launch method
- Precast concrete
- Prestressed concrete
- Prestressed structure
- Reinforced concrete
- Segmental bridge
- Prestressing Wedges
