= Glossary of physics =

This glossary of physics is a list of definitions of terms and concepts relevant to physics, its sub-disciplines, and related fields, including mechanics, materials science, nuclear physics, particle physics, and thermodynamics. For more inclusive glossaries concerning related fields of science and technology, see Glossary of chemistry terms, Glossary of astronomy, Glossary of areas of mathematics, and Glossary of engineering.

== A ==
ab initio
A mathematical model which seeks to describe atomic nuclei by solving the non-relativistic Schrödinger equation for all constituent nucleons and the forces that exist between them. Such methods yield precise results for very light nuclei but become more approximate for heavier nuclei.
Abbe number

In optics and lens design, a measure of a transparent material's dispersion (a variation of refractive index versus wavelength). High values of V indicate low dispersion.
absolute electrode potential
In electrochemistry, the electrode potential of a metal measured with respect to a universal reference system (without any additional metal–solution interface).
absolute humidity
The ratio of the water vapor in a sample of air to the volume of the sample.
absolute motion
absolute pressure
Is zero-referenced against a perfect vacuum, using an absolute scale, so it is equal to gauge pressure plus atmospheric pressure.
absolute scale
Any system of measurement that begins at a minimum, or zero point, and progresses in only one direction. The zero point of an absolute scale is a natural minimum, leaving only one direction in which to progress, whereas an arbitrary or "relative" scale begins at some point selected by a person and can progress in both directions.
absolute zero
The theoretical lowest possible temperature, understood by international agreement as equivalent to 0 Kelvin or −273.15 °C (−459.67 °F). More formally, it is the theoretical lower limit of the thermodynamic temperature scale, at which enthalpy and entropy of a cooled ideal gas reach their minimum values and the fundamental particles of nature have minimal vibrational motion.
absorption spectroscopy
Any of various spectroscopic techniques that measure the absorption of electromagnetic radiation due to its interaction with a sample. The sample absorbs energy, i.e. photons, from the radiating field. The intensity of the absorption varies as a function of frequency or wavelength, and this variation is the absorption spectrum. Absorption spectroscopy is performed across the electromagnetic spectrum.
absorbance
A logarithmic value which describes the portion of a beam of light which does not pass through a sample.
Absorption (acoustics)
The process by which a material, structure, or object takes in sound energy when sound waves are encountered, as opposed to reflecting the energy.
accelerating expansion of the universe
The observation that the expansion of the universe is such that the velocity at which a distant galaxy is receding from the observer is continuously increasing with time.
acceleration
The rate at which the velocity of a body changes with time, also the rate of change of the rate at which the position of a body changes with time.
acceleration due to gravity
The acceleration on an object caused by the force of gravitation.
accelerometer
An instrument used to measure the proper acceleration of a body irrespective of other forces.
acoustics
The branch of physics dealing with the production, transmission, and effects of sound.
adhesion
adhesion is what makes things stick together. It's the force that allows tape to stick to a surface or glue to hold two objects together. Contrast cohesion.
adiabatic cooling
Thermodynamic process where the temperature of a gas or air mass decreases as it expands without exchanging heat with its external environment.
adiabatic heating
Thermodynamic process where the temperature of a gas or air mass increases as it is compressed or as its pressure increasea without exchanging heat with its external environment.
}
adiabatic process
A process which occurs without transfer of heat or mass of substances between a thermodynamic system and its surroundings. In an adiabatic process, energy is transferred to the surroundings only as work. The adiabatic process provides a rigorous conceptual basis for the theory used to expound the first law of thermodynamics, and as such it is a key concept in thermodynamics.
aerodynamics
The study of the motion of air, particularly its interaction with a solid object, such as an airplane wing. It is a sub-field of fluid dynamics and gas dynamics, and many aspects of aerodynamics theory are common to these fields.
afocal system
An optical system that produces no net convergence or divergence of the beam, i.e. has an infinite effective focal length. This type of system can be created with a pair of optical elements where the distance between the elements is equal to the sum of each element's focal length ($d = f_1 + f_2$).
air mass
1. In meteorology, a volume of air that is defined by its temperature and water vapor content. Air masses may cover many hundreds or thousands of square miles and generally adapt to the characteristics of the surface below them. They are often classified according to their latitude and their source regions.
2. In astronomy, the "amount of air that one is looking through" when observing a star or other celestial source from a vantage point that is within Earth's atmosphere. It is formulated as the integral of air density along the light ray.
air mass coefficient
Defines the direct optical path length through the Earth's atmosphere, expressed as a ratio relative to the path length vertically upwards, i.e. at the zenith. The air mass coefficient can be used to help characterize the solar spectrum after solar radiation has traveled through the atmosphere.
albedo
The fraction of the total light incident on a reflecting surface, especially a celestial body, which is reflected back in all directions.
alloy
A chemical mixture of a metal with one or more other metals or other elements.
alpha decay

A type of radioactive decay in which an atomic nucleus emits an alpha particle and thereby transforms or "decays" into a different atomic nucleus, with a mass number that is reduced by four and an atomic number that is reduced by two.
alpha particle (α)

A type of subatomic particle consisting of two protons and two neutrons bound together into a particle identical to the nucleus of a helium-4 ion. It has a charge of +2 e and a mass of 4 u. Alpha particles are classically produced in the process of radioactive alpha decay, but may also be produced in other ways and given the same name.
alternating current (AC)
A form of electric current in which the movement of electric charge periodically reverses direction. Contrast direct current.
ammeter
An instrument used to measure electric current.
amorphous solid
A type of solid which does not have a definite geometric shape.
ampere (A)

The SI base unit of electric current, defined as one coulomb of electric charge per second.
amplifier

An electronic device that can increase the power of a signal (a time-varying voltage or current). It is a two-port electronic circuit that uses electric power from a power supply to increase the amplitude of a signal applied to its input terminals, producing a proportionally greater amplitude signal at its output. The amount of amplification provided by an amplifier is measured by its gain: the ratio of output voltage, current, or power to input. By definition, an amplifier is any circuit that has a power gain greater than one.
amplitude
The height of a wave as measured from its center (normal) position.
angle of incidence
In geometric optics, the angle between a ray incident on a surface and the line perpendicular to the surface at the point of incidence, called the normal. The ray can be formed by any wave: optical, acoustic, microwave, X-ray, etc.
angle of reflection
The change in direction of a wavefront at an interface between two different media such that the wavefront returns into the medium from which it originated. Common examples include the reflection of light, sound, and water waves. The law of reflection says that for specular reflection the angle at which the wave is incident on the surface equals the angle at which it is reflected. Mirrors exhibit specular reflection.
ångström (Å)
A unit of length primarily used to measure subatomic particles that is equal to 10^{−10} metres (one ten-billionth of a metre) or 0.1 nanometres.
angular acceleration
The time rate of change of angular velocity. In three dimensions, it is a pseudovector. In SI units, it is measured in radians per second squared (rad/s^{2}), and is usually denoted by the Greek letter alpha (α). Just like angular velocity, there are two types of angular acceleration: spin angular acceleration and orbital angular acceleration, representing the time rate of change of spin angular velocity and orbital angular velocity, respectively. Unlike linear acceleration, angular acceleration need not be caused by a net external torque. For example, a figure skater can speed up her rotation (thereby obtaining an angular acceleration) simply by contracting her arms inwards, which involves no external torque.
angular displacement
The angle (in radians, degrees, or revolutions) through which a point revolving around a centre or line has been rotated in a specified sense about a specified axis.
angular frequency (ω)

A scalar measure of rotation rate. It refers to the angular displacement per unit time (e.g. in the rotation of an astronomical body) or the rate of change of the phase of a sinusoidal waveform (e.g. in oscillations and waves), or as the rate of change of the argument of the sine function. Angular frequency (or angular speed) is the magnitude of the vector quantity that is angular velocity. The term angular frequency vector $\vec{\omega}$ is sometimes used as a synonym for the vector quantity angular velocity. One revolution is equal to 2π radians, hence

$$\omega = {{2 \pi} \over T} = {2 \pi f} ,$$

where:

ω is the angular frequency or angular speed (measured in radians per second),
T is the period (measured in seconds),
f is the ordinary frequency (measured in hertz) (sometimes symbolised with ν).

angular momentum

The rotational equivalent of linear momentum. It is an important quantity in physics because it is a conserved quantity–that is, the total angular momentum of a closed system remains constant.
angular velocity (ω)
A measure of the rate at which an object rotates or revolves relative to another point, i.e. how fast the angular position or orientation of an object changes with time. There are two types of angular velocity: spin angular velocity refers to how fast a rigid body rotates with respect to its centre of rotation, whereas orbital angular velocity refers to how fast a rigid body's centre of rotation revolves about a fixed origin, i.e. the time rate of change of its angular position relative to the origin. Angular velocity is generally expressed as an angle or arc per unit time; e.g. the SI unit of angular velocity is radians per second (rad/sec), with the radian having a dimensionless value of unity, so that the unit is often written as 1/sec. Angular velocity is usually represented by the Greek letter omega (ω, sometimes Ω). By convention, positive angular velocity indicates counter-clockwise rotation, while negative is clockwise.
anion
A negatively charged ion. Contrast cation.
annihilation
In particle physics, the process that occurs when a subatomic particle collides with its respective antiparticle to produce other particles, such as an electron colliding with a positron to produce two photons. The total energy and momentum of the initial pair are conserved in the process and distributed among a set of other particles in the final state. Antiparticles have exactly opposite additive quantum numbers from particles, so the sums of all quantum numbers of such an original pair are zero. Hence any set of particles may be produced whose total quantum numbers are also zero as long as conservation of energy and conservation of momentum are obeyed.
anode
The electrode through which a conventional electric current flows into a polarized electrical device; the direction of current flow is, by convention, opposite to the direction of electron flow, and so electrons flow out of the anode. In a galvanic cell, the anode is the negative terminal or pole which emits electrons toward the external part of an electrical circuit. However, in an electrolytic cell, the anode is the wire or plate having excess positive charge, so named because negatively charged anions tend to move towards it. Contrast cathode.
anti-gravity
A theory of creating a place or object that is free from the force of gravity. It does not refer to the lack of weight under gravity experienced in free fall or orbit, or to balancing the force of gravity with some other force, such as electromagnetism or aerodynamic lift.
antimatter
antineutron
The antiparticle of the neutron, with symbol n̅. It differs from the neutron only in that some of its properties have equal magnitude but opposite sign. It has the same mass as the neutron, and no net electric charge, but has opposite baryon number (+1 for the neutron, −1 for the antineutron). This is because the antineutron is composed of antiquarks, while neutrons are composed of ordinary quarks. The antineutron consists of one up antiquark and two down antiquarks.
antiparticle
In particle physics, every type of particle has an associated antiparticle with the same mass but with opposite physical charges such as electric charge. For example, the antiparticle of the electron is the antielectron (often referred to as the positron). While the electron has a negative electric charge, the positron has a positive electric charge, and is produced naturally in certain types of radioactive decay. Some particles, such as the photon, are their own antiparticle. Otherwise, for each pair of antiparticle partners, one is designated as "normal" matter (the kind comprising all matter with which humans usually interact), and the other (usually given the prefix "anti-") as antimatter.
antiproton
The antiparticle of the proton, having the same mass but a negative electric charge and an oppositely directed magnetic moment.
antiquark
For every quark flavor there is a corresponding type of antiparticle known as an antiquark that differs from the quark only in that some of its properties (such as the electric charge) have equal magnitude but opposite sign.
arc length
Archimedes' principle
A physical principle which states that the upward buoyant force that is exerted on a body immersed in a fluid, whether fully or partially submerged, is equal to the weight of the fluid that the body displaces and acts in the upward direction at the center of mass of the displaced fluid.
area moment of inertia
astrophysics
The branch of astronomy that deals with the physics of the Universe, especially with the compositional nature of celestial bodies rather than their positions or motions in space.
attenuation coefficient
The measure of how much the incident energy beam (e.g. ultrasound or x-rays) is weakened by the material it is passing through.
atom
A basic unit of matter that consists of a dense central nucleus surrounded by a cloud of negatively charged electrons. The atomic nucleus contains a mix of positively charged protons and electrically neutral neutrons.
atomic line filter
atomic mass
atomic mass unit
A deprecated term, usually referring to the unified atomic mass unit, a carbon-based standard, but historically referring to an oxygen-based standard.
atomic number (Z)
The number of protons found in the nucleus of an atom. It is most often used to classify elements within the periodic table.
atomic orbital
atomic packing factor
atomic physics
A branch of physics that studies atoms as isolated systems of electrons and an atomic nucleus. Compare nuclear physics.
atomic structure
atomic weight (A)
The sum total of protons (or electrons) and neutrons within an atom.
audio frequency

A periodic vibration whose frequency is in the band audible to the average human, i.e. within the standard human hearing range (generally accepted as 20 to 20,000 Hz). It is the property of sound that most determines pitch.
Avogadro constant
The ratio of the number of constituent particles in a substance, usually atoms or molecules, to the amount of substance, of which the SI unit is the mole. It is defined as exactly 6.02214076×10^{23} mol^{−1}.
Avogadro number
The total number of individual particles, molecules, or other indivisible units in one mole of a substance, or exactly 6.02214076×10^{23} by definition.
Avogadro's law
A physical law which states that volumes of gases which are equal to each other at the same temperature and pressure will contain equal numbers of molecules.
axion
A hypothetical subatomic particle postulated to account for the rarity of processes that break charge-parity symmetry. It is very light, electrically neutral, and pseudoscalar.
azimuthal quantum number
A quantum number for an atomic orbital that determines its orbital angular momentum and describes the shape of the orbital.

== B ==
Babinet's principle
A theorem concerning diffraction which states that the diffraction pattern from an opaque body is identical to that from a hole of the same size and shape except for the overall forward beam intensity.
background radiation
The ubiquitous ionizing radiation to which the general human population is exposed.
balanced forces
When all the forces acting upon an object balance each other, the object will be at equilibrium; it will not accelerate.
ballistics
Balmer series

In atomic physics, one of a set of six named series describing the spectral line emissions of the hydrogen atom. The Balmer series is calculated using the Balmer formula, an empirical equation discovered by Johann Balmer in 1885.
barometer
A scientific instrument used in meteorology to measure atmospheric pressure. Pressure tendency can forecast short-term changes in the weather.
baryon
A class of composite subatomic particle in the hadron family, such as a proton or a neutron, each of which is made of (usually) three quarks. Nearly all matter humans are likely to encounter is baryonic matter. Baryons are also considered fermions.
battery
A combination of two or more electrical cells which produces electricity.
beam
A structural element that is capable of withstanding a load primarily by resisting bending. Beams are traditionally descriptions of building or civil engineering structural elements, but smaller structures such as truck or automobile frames, machine frames, and other mechanical or structural systems contain beam structures that are designed and analyzed in a similar fashion.
bending

The behavior of a slender structural element (e.g. a beam) which is subjected to an external load applied perpendicularly to a longitudinal axis of the element.
bending moment
The reaction induced in a structural element when an external force or moment is applied to the element, causing the element to bend. The simplest structural element subjected to bending moments is the beam.
Bernoulli equation
Bernoulli's principle
In fluid dynamics, a principle which states that an increase in the speed of a fluid occurs simultaneously with a decrease in pressure or a decrease in the fluid's potential energy.
Bessel function
A canonical solution y(x) of Friedrich Bessel's differential equation

$$x^2 \frac{d^2 y}{dx^2} + x \frac{dy}{dx} + \left(x^2 - \alpha^2 \right)y = 0$$

for an arbitrary complex number α, the order of the Bessel function. Although α and −α produce the same differential equation, it is conventional to define different Bessel functions for these two values in such a way that the Bessel functions are mostly smooth functions of α. The most important cases are when α is an integer or half-integer. Bessel functions for integer α are also known as cylinder functions or the cylindrical harmonics because they appear in the solution to Laplace's equation in cylindrical coordinates. Spherical Bessel functions with half-integer α are obtained when the Helmholtz equation is solved in spherical coordinates.
beta decay

In nuclear physics, a type of radioactive decay in which a beta particle is emitted from an atomic nucleus, transforming the original nuclide to its isobar.
beta particle
A high-energy, high-speed electron or positron emitted by certain types of radioactive atomic nuclei.
Big Bang
The prevailing cosmological model that describes the early development of the Universe.
binding energy
The mechanical energy required to disassemble a whole into separate parts. A bound system typically has a lower potential energy than the sum of its constituent parts.
binomial random variable
biocatalysis
biophysics
An interdisciplinary science using methods of and theories from physics to study biological systems.
black body
A hypothetical idealized physical body that completely absorbs all incident electromagnetic radiation, regardless of frequency or angle of incidence. Perfect black bodies are imagined as substitutes for actual physical bodies in many theoretical discussions of thermodynamics, and the construction of nearly perfect black bodies in the real world remains a topic of interest for materials engineers. Contrast white body.
black-body radiation
The type of electromagnetic radiation within or surrounding a body in thermodynamic equilibrium with its environment, or emitted by a black body (an opaque and non-reflective body) held at constant, uniform temperature. The radiation has a specific spectrum and intensity that depends only on the temperature of the body.
block and tackle
A system of two or more pulleys with a rope or cable threaded between them, usually used to lift or pull heavy loads.
Bohr model
boiling point
The temperature at which a liquid undergoes a phase change into a gas; the vapour pressure of liquid and gas are equal at this temperature.
boiling point elevation
The phenomenon by which the boiling point of a liquid (a solvent) increases when another compound is added, meaning that the resulting solution has a higher boiling point than the pure solvent. This happens whenever a non-volatile solute, such as a salt, is added to a pure solvent, such as water. The boiling point can be measured accurately using an ebullioscope.
Boltzmann constant
A physical constant relating the average kinetic energy of the particles in a gas with the temperature of the gas. It is the gas constant R divided by the Avogadro constant NA.
Bose–Einstein condensate (BEC)
boson
A type of subatomic particle that behaves according to Bose–Einstein statistics and possesses integer spin. Bosons include elementary particles such as photons, gluons, W and Z bosons, Higgs bosons, and the hypothetical graviton, as well as certain composite particles such as mesons and stable nuclides of even mass number. Bosons constitute one of two main classes of particles, the other being fermions. Unlike fermions, there is no limit to the number of bosons that can occupy the same quantum state.
Boyle's law
A chemical law which states that the volume of a given mass of a gas at constant temperature is inversely proportional to its pressure.
Bra–ket notation
Bragg's law
bremsstrahlung
Radiation emitted by the acceleration of unbound charged particles.
Brewster's angle

The angle of incidence at which light with a particular polarization is completely transmitted through a transparent dielectric surface, with no reflection. When unpolarized light is incident at this angle, the light that is reflected is consequently perfectly polarized.
british thermal unit (btu)
An Imperial unit of energy defined as the amount of energy needed to heat one pound of water by one degree Fahrenheit; 1 btu is equal to about 1,055 joules. In scientific contexts the btu has largely been replaced by the SI unit of energy, the joule.
brittleness
The tendency of a material to break without significant plastic deformation when subjected to stress. Brittle materials absorb relatively little energy prior to fracture, even those of high strength. Breaking is often accompanied by a snapping sound.
Brownian motion

The apparently random movement of particles suspended in a fluid (liquid or gas) resulting from their continuous bombardment by fast-moving atoms or molecules in the gas or liquid.
bubble
A globule of a gaseous substance immersed or suspended in a liquid; e.g. a pocket of air completely enclosed by water, usually but not necessarily assuming a spherical shape.
Bulk modulus
A measure of a substance's resistance to uniform compression defined as the ratio of the infinitesimal pressure increase to the resulting relative decrease of the volume. Its base unit is the pascal.
buoyancy
An upward force exerted by a fluid that opposes the weight of an immersed object.

== C ==
calculus
A branch of mathematics that studies change and has two major sub-fields: differential calculus (concerning rates of change and slopes of curves), and integral calculus (concerning accumulation of quantities and the areas under and between curves). These two branches are related to each other by the fundamental theorem of calculus.
capacitance
The ratio of the change in the electric charge of a system to the corresponding change in its electric potential. There are two closely related notions of capacitance: self capacitance and mutual capacitance. Any object that can be electrically charged exhibits self capacitance. A material with a large self capacitance holds more electric charge at a given voltage than one with low capacitance. The notion of mutual capacitance is particularly important for understanding the operations of the capacitor, one of the three elementary linear electronic components (along with resistors and inductors).
capacitive reactance
An opposition to the change of voltage across an electrical circuit element. Capacitive reactance $\scriptstyle{X_C}$ is inversely proportional to the signal frequency $\scriptstyle{f}$ (or angular frequency, ω) and the capacitance $\scriptstyle{C}$.
capacitor
An electrical circuit element consisting of two conductors separated by an insulator (also known as a dielectric).
Carnot cycle
A theoretical ideal thermodynamic cycle proposed by French physicist Nicolas Léonard Sadi Carnot in 1824 and expanded upon by others in the 1830s and 1840s. It provides an upper limit on the efficiency that any classical thermodynamic engine can achieve during the conversion of heat into work, or conversely, the efficiency of a refrigeration system in creating a temperature difference by the application of work to the system. It is not an actual thermodynamic cycle but is a theoretical construct.
Cartesian coordinate system
A coordinate system that specifies each point uniquely in a plane by a set of numerical coordinates, which are the signed distances to the point from two fixed perpendicular oriented lines, measured in the same unit of length. Each reference line is called a coordinate axis or just axis (plural axes) of the system, and the point where they meet is called the origin, at ordered pair (0, 0). The coordinates can also be defined as the positions of the perpendicular projections of the point onto the two axes, expressed as signed distances from the origin.
cathode
The electrode through which a conventional electric current flows out of a polarized electrical device; the direction of current flow is, by convention, opposite to the direction of electron flow, and so electrons flow into the cathode. In a galvanic cell, the cathode is the positive terminal or pole which accepts electrons flowing from the external part of an electrical circuit. However, in an electrolytic cell, the cathode is the wire or plate having excess negative charge, so named because positively charged cations tend to move towards it. Contrast anode.
cathode ray
cation
A positively charged ion. Contrast anion.
celestial mechanics
Celsius scale

A scale and unit of measurement of temperature.
center of curvature
center of gravity
The point in a body around which the resultant torque due to gravity forces vanish. Near the surface of the earth, where gravity acts downward as a parallel force field, the center of gravity and the center of mass are the same.
center of mass
Within a given distribution of mass, the unique point in space at which the weighted relative position of the distributed mass sums to zero.
center of pressure
centigrade
See Celsius scale.
central-force problem
A classic problem in potential theory involving the determination of the motion of a particle in a single central potential field. The solutions to such problems are important in classical mechanics, since many naturally occurring forces, such as gravity and electromagnetism, are central forces.
centrifugal force
The apparent outward force that draws a rotating body away from the centre of rotation. It is caused by the inertia of the body as the body's path is continually redirected.
centripetal force
A force which keeps a body moving with a uniform speed along a circular path and is directed along the radius towards the centre.
cGh physics
Any attempt in mainstream physics to unify existing theories of relativity, gravitation, and quantum mechanics, particularly by envisioning the three universal constants fundamental to each field – the speed of light ($c$), the gravitational constant ($G$), and the Planck constant ($h$) – as the edges of a three-dimensional cube, at each corner of which is positioned a major sub-field within theoretical physics according to which of the three constants are accounted for by that sub-field and which are ignored. One corner of this so-called "cube of theoretical physics", where all three constants are accounted for simultaneously, has not yet been satisfactorily described: quantum gravity.
chain reaction
A sequence of reactions in which a reactive product or byproduct causes additional similar reactions to take place.
change of base rule
charge carrier
chemical physics
A branch of chemistry and physics that studies chemical processes from the point of view of physics by investigating physicochemical phenomena using techniques from atomic and molecular physics and condensed matter physics.
chromatic aberration
circular motion
classical mechanics

A sub-field of mechanics concerned with the set of physical laws describing the motion of bodies under the collective actions of a system of forces.
coefficient of friction
coherence
cohesion
The tendency of similar particles or surfaces to cling to one another. Contrast adhesion.
cold fusion
complex harmonic motion
composite particle
Compton scattering
A type of light–matter interaction in which a photon is scattered by a charged particle, usually an electron, which results in part of the energy of the photon being transferred to the recoiling electron; a resulting decrease in the energy of the photon is called the Compton effect. The opposite phenomenon occurs in inverse Compton scattering, when a charged particle transfers part of its energy to a photon.
concave lens
condensation point
condensed matter physics
A branch of physics that studies the physical properties of condensed phases of matter.
conservation of momentum
conservation law
constructive interference
continuous spectrum
continuum mechanics
convection
The transfer of heat by the actual transfer of matter.
convex lens
coulomb (C)
The SI derived unit of electric charge, defined as the charge transported by a constant current of one ampere in one second.
Coulomb's law
converging lens
cosmic background radiation
creep
crest
The point on a wave with the maximum value or upward displacement within a cycle.
crest factor
critical angle
critical mass
The smallest amount of fissile material needed for a sustained nuclear chain reaction.
cube of theoretical physics
See cGh physics.
Curie temperature
current density
current length
curvilinear motion
The motion of a moving particle or object that conforms to a known or fixed curve. Such motion is studied with two coordinate systems: planar motion and cylindrical motion.
cyclotron
A type of particle accelerator in which charged particles accelerate outwards from the center along a spiral path.

== D ==
Dalton's law
damped vibration
Damping ratio
Any influence upon or within an oscillatory system that has the effect of reducing, restricting, or preventing its oscillations. Damping is a result of processes that dissipate the energy stored in the oscillation.
Darcy–Weisbach equation
dark energy
dark matter
DC motor
A mechanically commutated electric motor powered by direct current.
decibel
definite integral
deflection
The degree to which a structural element is displaced under a load. It may refer to an angle or a distance.
deformation
1. (mechanics)
2. (engineering)
density

A physical property of a substance defined as its mass per unit volume.
derivative
For a mathematical function of a real variable, a measurement of the sensitivity to change of the function value (output) with respect to a change in its argument (input); e.g. the derivative of the position of a moving object with respect to time is the object's velocity and measures how quickly the position of the object changes as time changes. Derivatives are a fundamental tool of calculus.
destructive interference
diamagnetism
dielectric
An electrical insulator that can be polarized by an applied electric field. When a dielectric material is placed in an electric field, electric charges do not flow through the material as they would in a conductor but only shift slightly from their equilibrium positions, with positive charges displaced in the direction of the field's flow and negative charges displaced in the opposite direction; this creates an internal electric field that reduces the larger field within the dielectric material.
diffraction
direct current (DC)
dispersion
displacement
1. (fluid) Occurs when an object or substance is immersed in a fluid, pushing the fluid particles out of the way and taking their place. The volume of the immersed object will be exactly equal to the volume of the displaced fluid, so that the volume of the immersed object can be deduced if the volume of the displaced fluid is measured.
2. (vector) The shortest distance from the initial to the final position of a point. Thus, it is the length of an imaginary straight-line path, typically distinct from the path actually travelled.
distance
A numerical description of how far apart objects are.
drift velocity
Doppler effect
The change in frequency of a wave (or other periodic event) for an observer moving relative to its source. Compared to the emitted frequency, the received frequency is higher during the approach, identical at the instant of passing by, and lower during the recession.
drag
Forces which act on a solid object in the direction of the relative fluid flow velocity. Unlike other resistive forces, such as dry friction, which is nearly independent of velocity, drag forces depend on velocity.
ductility
A solid material's ability to deform under tensile stress; this is often characterized by the material's ability to be stretched into a wire.
dynamics
The branch of classical mechanics that studies forces and torques and their effects on motion, as opposed to kinematics, which studies motion without reference to these forces.
dyne

== E ==
econophysics
elastic collision
elastic energy
elastic instability
elastic modulus
elasticity
The tendency of a material to return to its original shape after it is deformed.
electric charge
A physical property of matter that causes it to experience a force when near other electrically charged matter. There are two types of electric charge: positive and negative.
electric circuit
An electrical network consisting of a closed loop, giving a return path for the current.
electric current

A flow of electric charge through a conductive medium.
electric displacement field
electric field
The region of space surrounding electrically charged particles and time-varying magnetic fields. The electric field represents the force exerted on other electrically charged objects by the electrically charged particle the field is surrounding.
electric field gradient
electric field intensity
electric generator
electric motor
electric potential
electric power
The rate at which electric energy is transferred by an electric circuit.
electrical conductor

Any material which contains movable electric charges and therefore can conduct an electric current under the influence of an electric field.
electrical insulator

Any material whose internal electric charges do not flow freely and which therefore does not readily conduct an electric current under the influence of an electric field.
electrical potential energy
electrical and electronics engineering
electrical network
An interconnection of electrical elements such as resistors, inductors, capacitors, voltage sources, current sources, and switches.
electrical resistance

The opposition to the passage of an electric current through an electrical element. Good insulators typically have very high electrical resistance.
electricity
The set of physical phenomena associated with the presence and flow of electric charges.
electro-optic effect
electrochemical cell
electrodynamics
electrolytic cell
electromagnet
A type of magnet in which the magnetic field is produced by the flow of an electric current.
electromagnetic field

A physical field produced by moving electrically charged objects.
electromagnetic induction
electromagnetic radiation

A form of energy emitted and absorbed by charged particles, which exhibits wave-like behavior as it travels through space.
electromagnetic spectrum
electromagnetic wave equation
electromagnetism
electromechanics
electromotive force ($\mathcal{E}$)

The electrical intensity or "pressure" developed by a source of electrical energy such as a battery or generator and measured in volts. Any device that converts other forms of energy into electrical energy provides electromotive force as its output.
electron
A subatomic particle with a negative elementary electric charge.
electron capture
electron cloud
electron pair
electron paramagnetic resonance

A method for studying materials with unpaired electrons which makes use of the Zeeman effect. It shares some basic principles with nuclear magnetic resonance (NMR).
electronvolt (eV)
A unit of energy equal to approximately 1.6×10^{−19} joule. By definition, it is the amount of energy gained by the charge of a single electron moved across an electric potential difference of one volt.
electronegativity
A chemical property that describes the tendency of an atom or a functional group to attract electrons (or electron density) towards itself.
electronics
A field that deals with electrical circuits that involve active electrical components such as vacuum tubes, transistors, diodes, and integrated circuits as well as associated passive interconnection technologies.
electrostatics
electrostriction
elementary charge
elementary particle
emission spectrum
emissivity
energy
The ability to do work.
energy level
endothermic
An adjective used to refer to a process or reaction in which a system absorbs energy from its surroundings, usually in the form of heat but also in the form of light, electricity, or sound. Contrast exothermic.
engineering physics
enthalpy
entropy
A quantity which describes the randomness or "disorder" of a substance or system.
equilibrant force
equipartition
escape velocity
The velocity at which the kinetic energy plus the gravitational potential energy of an object is zero. It is the speed needed to "escape" from a gravitational field without further propulsion.
excited state
exothermic
An adjective used to refer to a process or reaction that releases energy from a system, usually in the form of heat but also in the form of light, electricity, or sound. Contrast endothermic.
experimental physics

== F ==
farad
falling bodies
Objects that are moving towards a body with greater gravitational influence, such as a planet.
faraday
Faraday constant
Fermat's principle
Fermi surface
fermion
A type of particle that behaves according to Fermi–Dirac statistics, obeys the Pauli exclusion principle, and possesses half-integer spin. Fermions include all quarks and leptons, as well as all composite particles made of an odd number of these (such as all baryons and many atoms and nuclei). Fermions constitute one of two main classes of particles, the other being bosons.
ferrimagnetism
ferromagnetism
field line
first law of thermodynamics
fission
Either a nuclear reaction or a radioactive decay process in which the nucleus of an atom splits into smaller parts (lighter nuclei), often producing free neutrons and photons (in the form of gamma rays) and releasing relatively large amounts of energy.
flavour
fluid
fluid mechanics
fluid physics
fluid statics
fluorescence
flux
flux density
focal length
focus
force (F)
Any interaction or influence that, unless counterbalanced by other forces, will cause a physical body to change its velocity or shape. A force has both magnitude and direction, making it a vector quantity. The SI unit used to measure force is the newton.
force carrier
force field
frame of reference
Fraunhofer lines
free body diagram
frequency
frequency modulation
free fall
Any motion of a body where its own weight is the only force acting upon it.
freezing point
The temperature at which a substance changes state from liquid to solid.
friction
function
fundamental forces

fundamental frequency
fundamental theorem of calculus
fusion
A nuclear reaction in which two or more atomic nuclei join together or "fuse" to form a single, heavier nucleus.

== G ==
gamma ray
A form of electromagnetic radiation of very high frequency and therefore very high energy.
gas
general relativity
geophysics
gluon
Graham's law of diffusion
gravitation

A natural phenomenon by which physical bodies attract each other with a force proportional to their masses.
gravitational constant (G)

A physical constant involved in the calculation of the gravitational force between two bodies.
gravitational energy
The potential energy associated with a gravitational field.
gravitational field
A model used to explain the influence that a massive body extends into the space around itself, producing a force (gravity) capable of interacting with or influencing other nearby physical bodies. Thus, a gravitational field is used to explain and represent gravitational phenomena. It is measured in newtons per kilogram (N/kg).
gravitational potential
The gravitational potential at a location is equal to the work (energy transferred) per unit mass that is done by the force of gravity to move an object to a fixed reference location.
gravitational wave
A ripple in the curvature of spacetime that propagates as a wave and is generated in certain gravitational interactions, travelling outward from their source.
graviton
A hypothetical elementary particle that meditates the force of gravitation.
gravity
See gravitation.
ground
ground reaction force
ground state
group velocity

== H ==
hadron
A composite particle made from two or more quarks held together by the strong force. Protons and neutrons are both considered hadrons.
half-life
The time required for a quantity to fall to half its value as measured at the beginning of the time period. In physics, half-life typically refers to a property of radioactive decay, but may refer to any quantity which follows an exponential decay.
Hamilton's principle
Hamiltonian mechanics
harmonic mean
heat
A form of energy transferred from one body to another by thermal interaction.
heat transfer
Helmholtz free energy
hertz
The SI unit of frequency, defined as the number of cycles per second of a periodic phenomenon.
Higgs boson
homeokinetics
The physics of complex, self-organizing systems.
horsepower (hp)
Huygens–Fresnel principle
hydrostatics

== I ==
ice point
A physical process that results in the phase transition of a substance from a liquid to a solid.
impedance
The measure of the opposition that an electric circuit presents to a current when a voltage is applied.
implosion
impulse
The change in momentum, which is equal to the average net external force multiplied by the length of time this force acts.
indefinite integral
inductance
infrasound
inertia
The resistance of any physical object to a change in its state of motion or rest, or the tendency of an object to resist any change in its motion.
inductive reactance
integral
integral transform
International System of Units (SI)
The modern form of the metric system, comprising a system of units of measurement devised around seven base units and the convenience of the number ten.
invariant mass
ion
An atom or molecule in which the total number of electrons is not equal to the total number of protons, giving the atom a net positive or negative electric charge.
ionic bond
A type of chemical bond formed through an electrostatic attraction between two oppositely charged ions.
ionization
The process of converting an atom or molecule into an ion by adding or removing charged particles such as electrons or other ions.
ionization chamber
ionizing radiation
isotope
A variant of a particular chemical element. While all atoms of a given element share the same number of protons, each isotope differs from the others in its number of neutrons.

== J ==
Josephson effect
joule (J)
A derived unit of energy, work, or amount of heat in the International System of Units.
jerk
The rate of change of acceleration, or the third derivative of displacement.

== K ==
Kelvin
A scale and unit of measurement of temperature. The Kelvin scale is an absolute thermodynamic temperature scale which uses absolute zero as its null point.
kinematics
The branch of classical mechanics that describes the motion of points, bodies (objects), and systems of bodies (groups of objects) without consideration of the causes of motion. The study of kinematics is often referred to as the "geometry of motion".
kinetic energy
The energy that a physical body possesses due to its motion, defined as the work needed to accelerate a body of a given mass from rest to its stated velocity. The body continues to maintain this kinetic energy unless its velocity changes. Contrast potential energy.
Kirchhoff's circuit laws

Two approximate equalities that deal with the current and voltage in electrical circuits. See Kirchhoff's laws for other meanings of the term.
Kirchhoff's equations
In fluid dynamics, a set of equations which describe the motion of a rigid body in an ideal fluid.

== L ==
Lagrangian mechanics
laminar flow

Occurs when a fluid flows in parallel layers with no disruption between the layers.
Laplace transform
Laplace–Runge–Lenz vector

A vector used chiefly to describe the shape and orientation of the orbit of one astronomical body around another, such as a planet revolving around a star. For two bodies interacting by Newtonian gravity, the LRL vector is a constant of motion, meaning that it is the same no matter where it is calculated on the orbit; equivalently, the LRL vector is said to be conserved.
laser
A device that emits light through a process of optical amplification based on the stimulated emission of electromagnetic radiation. The word "laser" is an acronym for "light amplification by stimulated emission of radiation".
law of universal gravitation
LC circuit
A circuit consisting of an inductor (with inductance L) and a capacitor (with capacitance C).
Lenz's law
lepton
An elementary particle which does not undergo strong interactions but is subject to the Pauli exclusion principle. Two main classes of leptons exist: charged leptons (also known as the electron-like leptons) and neutral leptons (better known as neutrinos).
lever
A type of machine consisting of a beam or rigid rod pivoted at a fixed hinge or fulcrum; one of six classical simple machines.
levitation
light
A form of electromagnetic radiation that occupies a certain range of wavelengths within the electromagnetic spectrum. In physics, the term sometimes refers collectively to electromagnetic radiation of any wavelength, in which case light includes gamma rays, X-rays, microwaves, and radio waves, but in common usage "light" more often refers specifically to visible light.
linear actuator
A form of motor that generates a linear movement directly.
linear algebra
The branch of mathematics concerning vector spaces, often finite or countably infinite dimensional, as well as linear mappings between such spaces.
line of force
linear elasticity
The mathematical study of how solid objects deform and become internally stressed due to prescribed loading conditions. Linear elasticity is a simplification of the more general nonlinear theory of elasticity and is a branch of continuum mechanics.
Liouville's theorem
Phase space volume is conserved.
liquid
One of four classical states of matter having a definite volume but no fixed shape.
liquid crystal (LC)
A state of matter which has properties between those of a conventional liquid and those of a solid crystal. For instance, an LC may flow like a liquid, but its molecules may be oriented in a crystal-like way.
longitudinal wave

== M ==
M-theory
An extension of string theory that attempts to unify seemingly contradictory mathematical formulations and which identifies 11 dimensions.
Mach number
A dimensionless quantity representing the ratio of the speed of an object moving through a fluid to the local speed of sound.
Mach's principle
The proposition that the existence of absolute rotation (the distinction of local inertial frames vs. rotating reference frames) is determined by the large-scale distribution of matter.
machine
Any powered tool consisting of one or more parts that is constructed to achieve a particular goal. Machines are usually powered by mechanical, chemical, thermal, or electrical means, and are frequently motorised.
machine element
An elementary component of a machine. There are three basic types: structural components, mechanisms, and control components.
Maclaurin series
A representation of a function as an infinite sum of terms that are calculated from the values of the function's derivatives at a single point.
magnetic field
A mathematical description of the magnetic influence of electric currents and magnetic materials. The magnetic field at any given point is specified by both a direction and a magnitude (or strength); as such it is a vector field.
magnetism
A property of materials that respond to an applied magnetic field.
magnetostatics
mass
mass balance

An application of the law of conservation of mass to the analysis of physical systems.
mass density
See density.
mass flux
The rate of mass flow per unit area. The common symbols are j, J, φ, or Φ, sometimes with subscript m to indicate mass is the flowing quantity. Its SI units are kg s−1 m−2.
mass moment of inertia
A property of a distribution of mass in space that measures its resistance to rotational acceleration about an axis.
mass number

The total number of protons and neutrons (together known as nucleons) in an atomic nucleus.
mass spectrometry
material properties
materials science
An interdisciplinary field incorporating elements of physics, chemistry, and engineering that is concerned with the design and discovery of new materials, particularly solids.
mathematical physics
The application of mathematics to problems in physics and the development of mathematical methods suitable for such applications and for the formulation of physical theories.
mathematics
The abstract study of topics encompassing quantity, structure, space, change, and other properties.
matrix
A rectangular array of numbers, symbols, or expressions arranged in rows and columns. The individual items in a matrix are called its elements or entries.
matter
Any substance (often a particle) that has rest mass and (usually) also volume.
Maxwell's equations
A set of partial differential equations that, together with the Lorentz force law, form the foundation of classical electrodynamics, classical optics, and electric circuits. Maxwell's equations describe how electric and magnetic fields are generated and altered by each other and by charges and currents.
measure of central tendency
A term which relates to the way in which quantitative data tend to cluster around some value. A measure of central tendency is any of a number of ways of specifying this "central value".
mechanical energy
mechanical filter
mechanical equilibrium
mechanical wave
mechanics
The branch of science concerned with the behaviour of physical bodies when subjected to forces or displacements and the subsequent effects of the bodies on their environment.
melting

A physical process that results in the phase transition of a substance from a solid to a liquid.
meson
A type of hadronic subatomic particle composed of one quark and one antiquark bound together by the strong interaction. All mesons are unstable, with the longest-lived lasting for only a few hundredths of a microsecond.
modulus of elasticity
The mathematical description of an object's or substance's tendency to be deformed elastically (i.e. non-permanently) when a force is applied to it. The elastic modulus of an object is defined as the slope of its stress–strain curve in the elastic deformation region. As such, a stiffer material will have a higher elastic modulus.
molar concentration
molar mass
A physical property of matter defined as the mass of a given substance divided by the amount of substance and expressed in grams per mole.
molecule
An electrically neutral group of two or more atoms held together by covalent chemical bonds. Molecules are distinguished from ions by having a net electric charge equal to zero.
molecular physics
A branch of physics that studies the physical properties of molecules and the chemical bonds between atoms as well as their molecular dynamics. It is closely related to atomic physics and overlaps greatly with theoretical chemistry, physical chemistry and chemical physics.
moment
moment of inertia
A property of a distribution of mass in space that measures its resistance to rotational acceleration about an axis.
momentum
A vector quantity consisting of the product of the mass and velocity of an object.
monochromatic light
motion
Any change in the position of an object over time. Motion can be mathematically described in terms of displacement, distance, velocity, speed, acceleration, and momentum, and is observed by attaching a frame of reference to an observer and measuring the change in an object's position relative to that frame. An object's motion cannot change unless it is acted upon by a force.
muon
An elementary particle, technically classified as a lepton, that is similar to the electron, with unitary negative electric charge (−1) and a spin of 1/2. Muons are not believed to have any sub-structure.

== N ==
nanoengineering
The practice of engineering on the nanoscale. Nanoengineering is largely a synonym for nanotechnology, but emphasizes the applied rather the field.
nanotechnology

The manipulation of matter on an atomic and molecular scale; a more generalized description by the National Nanotechnology Initiative is "the manipulation of matter with at least one dimension sized from 1 to 100 nanometres".
Navier–Stokes equations
neurophysics
neutrino
A type of electrically neutral subatomic particle denoted by the Greek letter ν (nu). All evidence suggests that neutrinos have mass but that their mass is tiny even by the standards of subatomic particles. Their mass has never been measured accurately.
neutron
A subatomic particle having a mass slightly greater than that of a proton but no electric charge. Along with protons they constitute the nucleus of every atom. Each neutron consists of one up quark and two down quarks.
- prompt neutron

Immediate emission of neutrons after a nuclear fission event.

- delayed neutron

Delayed emission of neutrons after a nuclear fission event, by one of the fission products (actually, a fission product daughter after beta decay).

neutron cross-section
newton (N)
Newton's laws of motion
A set of three physical laws which describe the relationship between the forces acting on a body and its motion due to those forces. Together they form the basis for classical or Newtonian mechanics.
Newton's law of universal gravitation
Newtonian fluid
Newtonian mechanics
normal force
nuclear force
nuclear physics
The branch of physics that studies the constituents and interactions of atomic nuclei.
nuclear reaction
nuclear transmutation
nucleon
Either a proton or a neutron in its role as a component of an atomic nucleus.
nucleus
nuclide

An atomic species characterized by the specific composition of its nucleus, i.e. by its number of protons, its number of neutrons, and its nuclear energy state.

== O ==
ohm
The SI derived unit of electrical resistance.
Ohm's law
The electric current through a conductor between two points is directly proportional to the potential difference across the two points.
optical tweezers
An optomechanical device used for the capture, analysis, and manipulation of dielectric objects or particles, which operates via the application of force by the electric field of light.
optically detected magnetic resonance
An optical technique for the initialisation and readout of quantum spin in some crystal defects.
optics
The branch of physics which involves the behaviour and properties of light, including its interactions with matter and the construction of instruments that use or detect it. Optics usually describes the behaviour of visible, ultraviolet, and infrared light; however, other forms of electromagnetic radiation such as X-rays, microwaves, and radio waves exhibit similar properties.

== P ==
paraffin
parallel circuit
parity
1. (mathematics)
2. (physics)
particle
particle accelerator
particle displacement
particle physics
A branch of physics that studies the nature of particles, which are the constituents of what is usually referred to as matter and radiation.
Pascal's law
A principle in fluid mechanics which states that pressure exerted anywhere in a confined incompressible fluid is transmitted equally in all directions throughout the fluid such that the initial pressure variations remain the same.
Pauli exclusion principle
pendulum
periodic table of the elements

A tabular display of the chemical elements organised on the basis of their atomic numbers, electron configurations, and recurring chemical properties. Elements are presented in order of increasing atomic number (number of protons).
phase (matter)
phase (waves)
phase equilibrium
phenomenology
phosphorescence
photoelectric effect
photon
An elementary particle, the quantum of light and all other forms of electromagnetic radiation, and the force carrier for the electromagnetic force.
photonics
physical chemistry
The study of macroscopic, atomic, subatomic, and particulate phenomena in chemical systems in terms of laws and concepts of physics.
physical constant
physical quantity
physics
The natural science that involves the study of matter and its motion through space and time, along with related concepts such as energy and force. More broadly, it is the general analysis of nature, conducted in order to understand how the universe behaves.
piezoelectricity
pion
Planck constant ($h$)

A fundamental universal physical constant that is the quantum of action in quantum mechanics.
Planck units
Planck's law
plasma
plasma physics
plasticity
pneumatics
The study and control of mechanical force and movement generated by the application of compressed gas.
positron
potential energy
power
pressure
The ratio of force to the area over which that force is distributed.
principle of relativity
probability
A measure of the expectation that an event will occur or that a statement is true. Probabilities are given a value between 0 (will not occur) and 1 (will occur). The higher the probability of an event, the more certain one can be that the event will occur.
probability distribution
probability theory
proton
psi particle
pulley
A wheel on an axle that is designed to support movement of a cable or belt along its circumference; one of six classical simple machines. Pulleys are used in a variety of ways to lift loads, apply forces, and transmit power.
pulse
pulse wave

== Q ==
quantization
quantum
quantum chromodynamics
quantum electrodynamics (QED)
The relativistic quantum field theory of electrodynamics. In essence, it describes how light and matter interact and is the first theory where full agreement between quantum mechanics and special relativity is achieved. QED mathematically describes all phenomena involving electrically charged particles interacting by means of exchange of photons and represents the quantum counterpart of classical electromagnetism, giving a complete account of matter and light interaction.
quantum field theory
A theoretical framework for constructing quantum mechanical models of subatomic particles in particle physics and quasiparticles in condensed matter physics.
quantum gravity
quantum mechanics
A branch of physics dealing with physical phenomena at microscopic scales, where the action is on the order of the Planck constant. Quantum mechanics departs from classical mechanics at atomic and subatomic length scales, and provides a mathematical description of much of the dual particle-like and wave-like behavior and interactions of energy and matter that occur at this scale.
quantum number
quantum physics
quantum state
quark
An elementary particle and a fundamental constituent of matter. Quarks combine to form composite particles called hadrons, the most stable of which are protons and neutrons, the components of atomic nuclei.
quasiparticle

== R ==
radiant energy
radiation
radioactive decay
radionuclide

Any nuclide possessing excess nuclear energy to the point that it is unstable. Such excess energy is emitted through any of several processes of radioactive decay, resulting in a stable nuclide or sometimes another unstable radionuclide which can then undergo further decay. Certain radionuclides occur naturally; many others can be produced artificially in nuclear reactors, cyclotrons, particle accelerators, or radionuclide generators.
radius of curvature
redshift
A phenomenon which occurs when light seen coming from an object that is moving away from the observer is proportionally increased in wavelength or "shifted" to the red end of the visible light spectrum.
refraction
The change in direction of a wave as it passes from one transmission medium to another or as a result of a gradual change in the medium. Though most commonly used in the context of refraction of light, other waves such as sound waves and fluid waves also experience refraction.
refractive index
relative atomic mass
relativistic mechanics
relativity
rest frame
rigid body
An idealization of a solid body in which deformation is neglected. In other words, the distance between any two given points of a rigid body remains constant in time regardless of the external forces exerted on it. Even though such an object cannot physically exist due to relativity, objects can normally be assumed to be perfectly rigid if they are not moving near the speed of light.
rotational energy

The kinetic energy due to the rotation of an object, which forms part of its total kinetic energy.
rotational speed

The number of complete rotations or revolutions a rotating body makes per unit time.
Rydberg formula
A formula used in atomic physics to describe the wavelengths of spectral lines of many chemical elements.

== S ==
scalar
Any simple physical quantity that can be described by a single number (as opposed to vectors, tensors, etc., which are described by several numbers such as magnitude and direction) and is unchanged by coordinate system rotations or translations (in Newtonian mechanics) or by Lorentz transformations or central-time translations (in relativity).
scattering
The general physical process by which some forms of radiation, such as light, sound, or moving particles, are forced to deviate from a straight trajectory by one or more localised non-uniformities in the medium through which they pass.
science
A systematic enterprise that builds and organises knowledge in the form of testable explanations and predictions about the universe.
screw
A mechanism that converts rotational motion to linear motion, and a torque (rotational force) to a linear force; one of six classical simple machines.
second law of thermodynamics
Seebeck effect
series circuit
shadow matter
shear modulus

shear strength
shear stress
shortwave radiation (SW)
Radiant energy of the electromagnetic spectrum with wavelengths in the visible, near-ultraviolet, and near-infrared spectra, the broadest definition of which includes all radiation with a wavelength between 0.1 μm and 5.0 μm.
Schrödinger equation
A mathematical equation which describes the time evolution of wave functions in quantum mechanics.
simple harmonic motion
simple machine
A mechanical device that changes the direction or magnitude of a force. In general, a set of six classical simple machines identified by Renaissance scientists drawing from Greek texts on technology are collectively defined as the simplest mechanisms that can provide mechanical advantage (also called leverage).
siphon
A tube in an inverted U shape that causes a liquid to flow uphill without pumps, powered by the fall of the liquid as it flows down the tube under the pull of gravity. The term may also more generally refer to a wide variety of devices involving the flow of liquids through tubes.
Snell's law
solar cell
solid
solid mechanics
solid-state physics
solubility
The tendency of a solid, liquid, or gaseous chemical substance (called a solute) to dissolve in another solid, liquid, or gaseous substance (called a solvent) to form a homogeneous solution of the solute in the solvent. The solubility of a solute fundamentally depends on the specific solvent as well as on temperature and pressure.
sonoluminescence
sound
A mechanical wave that is an oscillation of pressure transmitted through a solid, liquid, or gas and composed of frequencies within the range of human hearing.
special relativity
specific activity
speed
speed of light ($c$)
A fundamental universal physical constant defined as exactly 299,792,458 metres per second, a figure that is exact because the length of the metre is defined from this constant and the international standard for time. When not otherwise qualified, the term "speed of light" usually refers to the speed of light in vacuum, as opposed to the speed of light through some physical medium.
speed of sound
spherical aberration
spin quantum number
stable isotope ratio
The relative abundances of the atomically stable isotopes of a given element as they occur in nature or in a particular experimental context.
stable nuclide
Any nuclide that is not radioactive and does not spontaneously undergo radioactive decay, as opposed to a radionuclide. When such nuclides are referred to in relation to specific elements, they are usually termed stable isotopes.
standard atomic weight
Standard Model
The theory of particle physics which describes three of the four known fundamental forces (the electromagnetic force, the weak force, and the strong force, but not the gravitational force) and classifies all known elementary particles.
standing wave
state of matter
statics
The branch of mechanics concerned with the analysis of loads (force and torque, or "moment") on physical systems in static equilibrium, that is, in a state where the relative positions of subsystems do not vary over time, or where components and structures are at a constant velocity.
statistical mechanics
stiffness
The rigidity of an object, i.e. the extent to which it resists deformation in response to an applied force.
strain
The transformation of a body from a reference configuration to a current configuration. A configuration is a set containing the positions of all particles of the body.
strain hardening
strength of materials
stress
1. An applied force or system of forces that tends to strain or deform a physical body.
2. A measure of the internal forces acting within a deformable body.
3. A quantitative measure of the average force per unit area of a surface within a body on which internal forces act.
stress–strain curve
string duality
string theory
strong interaction

structural load
subatomic particle
Any particle that is smaller than an atom.
sublimation
The physical process by which matter is transformed directly from the solid phase to the gas phase without passing through an intermediate liquid phase. Sublimation is an endothermic phase transition that occurs at temperatures and pressures below a substance's triple point in its phase diagram.
superconductivity
superconductor
A phenomenon of exactly zero electrical resistance and expulsion of magnetic fields occurring in certain materials when cooled below a characteristic critical temperature.
superhard material
superposition principle
supersymmetry (SUSY)
surface tension

== T ==
temperature
A physical property of matter that quantitatively expresses the common notions of hot and cold.
tensile modulus
tensile strength
tesla (T)
test particle
theoretical physics
A branch of physics that employs mathematical models and abstractions of physical objects and systems in order to rationalize, explain, and predict natural phenomena, as opposed to experimental physics, which relies on data generated by experimental observations.
theory of everything (ToE)
theory of relativity
thermal conduction
thermal equilibrium
A state in which there is no net flow of thermal energy between two physical systems when the systems are connected by a path permeable to heat. A system may also be said to be in thermal equilibrium with itself if the temperature within the system is spatially and temporally uniform. Systems in thermodynamic equilibrium are always in thermal equilibrium, but the converse is not always true.
thermal radiation
thermionic emission
thermodynamic equilibrium
thermodynamic free energy
thermodynamics
thermometer
An instrument used to measure temperature.
third law of thermodynamics
threshold frequency
torque

The tendency of a force to rotate an object about an axis, fulcrum, or pivot. Just as a force is a push or a pull, a torque can be thought of as a twist to an object.
total internal reflection
toughness
The ability of a material to absorb energy and plastically deform without fracturing. Material toughness is defined as the amount of energy per unit volume that a material can absorb before rupturing. It is also defined as the resistance to fracture of a material when stressed.
trajectory
The path that a moving object follows through space as a function of time.
transducer
transmission medium
transverse wave
trigonometry
A branch of mathematics that studies triangles and the relationships between their sides and the angles between these sides.
trimean
triple point
The temperature and pressure at which the three phases (gas, liquid, and solid) of a given substance coexist in thermodynamic equilibrium.
truncated mean

== U ==
unbalanced forces
When there is unbalanced force(s); and as such, the object changes its state of motion. The object is not at equilibrium and subsequently accelerates.
uncertainty principle
Any of a variety of mathematical inequalities asserting a fundamental limit to the precision with which certain pairs of physical properties of a particle, such as position x and momentum p, cannot be known simultaneously.
unified atomic mass unit
One dalton: one-twelfth the mass of an isolated neutral atom of the isotope ^{12}_{6}C in its ground state.
uniform motion
uniform circular motion
unit vector
utility frequency
The frequency of the oscillations of alternating current (AC) in an electric power grid transmitted from a power plant to the end-user.

== V ==
vacuum
An area of space which contains no matter.
valence electron
An electron that is associated with an atom and can participate in the formation of a chemical bond.
valence shell
The outermost electron shell of an atom.
valley of stability
Van de Graaff generator
variable capacitor
variable resistor
vector
Any quantity that has both magnitude and direction.
vector space
A mathematical structure formed by a collection of elements called vectors, which may be added together and multiplied ("scaled") by numbers called scalars.
velocity ($v$)
A vector quantity defined as the rate of change of the position of an object with respect to a given frame of reference. Velocity specifies both an object's speed and direction of motion (e.g. 60 kilometres per hour to the north).
virtual image
virtual particle
viscoelasticity
viscosity
visible light
A form of electromagnetic radiation generally defined as the range of wavelengths visible to the average human eye.
volt (V)
The SI derived unit for electric potential, electric potential difference, and electromotive force, defined as the difference in electric potential between two points of a conducting wire when an electric current of one ampere dissipates one watt of power between those two points.
Volta potential
voltage
voltmeter
An instrument used for measuring the difference in electric potential between two points in an electric circuit. Analog voltmeters move a pointer across a scale in proportion to the voltage of the circuit.
volt per metre
volume

== W ==
W and Z bosons
watt (W)
A derived unit of power in the International System of Units (SI) defined as one joule per second. The watt measures the rate of energy conversion or transfer.
wave
A disturbance or oscillation that travels through spacetime accompanied by a transfer of energy.
wave equation
wave function
wave function collapse
wave–particle duality
wavelength
A measure of the distance traversed by a single spatial period of a sinusoidal wave, i.e. the distance over which the wave's shape repeats.
weak interaction

One of the four fundamental forces of nature, along with the strong nuclear force, electromagnetism, and gravitation. It is responsible for the radioactive decay of subatomic particles and initiates the process known as hydrogen fusion in stars.
weber (Wb)
wedge
A triangular round tool in the form of a compound and portable inclined plane; one of six classical simple machines.
weight
wheel and axle
A wheel attached to an axle in such a way that the two parts rotate together and transfer forces between them; one of six classical simple machines.
white body
A hypothetical idealized physical body that reflects all incident electromagnetic radiation completely and uniformly in all directions; the opposite of a black body.
wind
The flow of gases on a large scale.
work
work function

== X ==
X-ray
A high-energy photon (between 100 eV and 100 keV) with a wavelength shorter than that of ultraviolet radiation and longer than that of gamma radiation.

== Y ==
Young’s modulus
A measure of the stiffness of a solid material which defines the relationship between mechanical stress and strain.

== Z ==
Zeeman effect
The effect of splitting a spectral line into several components in the presence of a static magnetic field by the lifting of degeneracy in electronic states.

== See also ==
- Outline of physics
- Index of physics articles
- Glossary of areas of mathematics
- Glossary of astronomy
- Glossary of biology
- Glossary of calculus
- Glossary of chemistry terms
- Glossary of engineering
- Glossary of probability and statistics
