= Intelligent pump =

An intelligent pump is a pump that has the ability to regulate and control flow or pressure. Typical advantages are energy savings, lifetime improvements and system cost reductions. Intelligent pumps are used in boilers and systems, temperature control, water treatment, industrial water supply, wash and clean, machining and desalination.

== Manufacturers ==
- Pump control system
- Chemical pump
- Intelligent micro pump
- Residential water pump
