= Invert level =

Bottom of a pipe, trench, or tunnel

A diagram showing a cross-section of a typical circular pipe with pipe geometry labels.

In civil engineering, the invert level is the base interior level of a pipe, trench or tunnel. It can be considered the "floor" level. The invert is an important datum for determining the functioning or flowline of a piping system.

Conversely, the obvert level, or crown level, is the highest interior level and can be considered the "ceiling" level, being the highest level of that sewer.

The bottom of the sewer is called the invert from a general resemblance in construction to an "inverted" arch. An inverted arch is a rounded structure with its crown facing in the downward position. This is a common term in structural architectural drawings.

Invert level is found through measuring the distance from the lowest level of a pipe and comparing to a fixed datum. Pipe lasers or other vertical distance measuring devices are most commonly used for this. Invert levels are taken into account to ensure drainage of non-pressured fluid pipes. Typically, the invert level of the pipe must be lower (or at least not higher) for each section of pipe in order to maintain continuous flow.

Many common types of pipe have pipe sections with a male and female (bell and spigot) ends. The invert refers to the measurement of the bottom of the bell end. This will be the lowest point of each stick of pipe.

Corrugated pipe is measured differently than a smooth wall pipe. When trying to find the invert level of a corrugated pipe, the high point of the ridges inside of the pipe are used, as water will fill up the trough between grooves before achieving steady flow down the pipe. The ridge-to-ridge diameter on the inside of the pipe is the nominal value of the pipe.
