= Belt friction =

Friction forces between a belt and a surface

Belt friction is a term describing the friction forces between a belt and a surface, such as a belt wrapped around a bollard. When a force applies a tension to one end of a belt or rope wrapped around a curved surface, the frictional force between the two surfaces increases with the amount of wrap about the curved surface, and only part of that force (or resultant belt tension) is transmitted to the other end of the belt or rope. Belt friction can be modeled by the Belt friction equation.

In practice, the theoretical tension acting on the belt or rope calculated by the belt friction equation can be compared to the maximum tension the belt can support. This helps a designer of such a system determine how many times the belt or rope must be wrapped around a curved surface to prevent it from slipping. Mountain climbers and sailing crews demonstrate a working knowledge of belt friction when accomplishing tasks with ropes, pulleys, bollards and capstans.

== Equation ==
The equation used to model belt friction is, assuming the belt has no mass and its material is a fixed composition:

$$T_2=T_1e^{\mu_s\beta} \,$$

where $T_2$ is the tension of the pulling side, $T_1$ is the tension of the resisting side, $\mu_s$ is the static friction coefficient, which has no units, and $\beta$ is the angle, in radians, formed by the first and last spots the belt touches the pulley, with the vertex at the center of the pulley.

The tension on the pulling side of the belt and pulley has the ability to increase exponentially if the magnitude of the belt angle increases (e.g. it is wrapped around the pulley segment numerous times).

== Generalization for a rope lying on an arbitrary orthotropic surface ==
If a rope is laying in equilibrium under tangential forces on a rough orthotropic surface then three following conditions (all of them) are satisfied:

1. No separation – normal reaction $N$ is positive for all points of the rope curve:

$N=-k_nT>0$, where $k_n$ is a normal curvature of the rope curve.

2. Dragging coefficient of friction $\mu_g$ and angle $\alpha$ are satisfying the following criteria for all points of the curve

$-\mu_g<\tan \alpha <+\mu_g$

3. Limit values of the tangential forces:

The forces at both ends of the rope $T$ and $T_0$ are satisfying the following inequality

$T_0 e^{-\int_s \omega ds}\le T \le T_0 e^{\int_s \omega ds}$

with $\omega = \mu_\tau \sqrt{ k_n^2 - \frac{k_g^2}{\mu_g^2}}=\mu_\tau k \sqrt{ \cos^2 \alpha - \frac{\sin^2 \alpha}{\mu_g^2}}$,

where $k_g$ is a geodesic curvature of the rope curve, $k$ is a curvature of a rope curve, $\mu_\tau$ is a coefficient of friction in the tangential direction.

If $\omega = const$ then $T_0 e^{-\mu_\tau k s \, \sqrt{ \cos^2 \alpha - \frac{\sin^2 \alpha}{\mu_g^2}}}\le T \le T_0 e^{\mu_\tau k s \, \sqrt{ \cos^2 \alpha - \frac{\sin^2 \alpha}{\mu_g^2}}}$.

This generalization has been obtained by Konyukhov A.,

== Friction coefficient ==
There are certain factors that help determine the value of the friction coefficient. These determining factors are:

- Belting material used – The age of the material also plays a part, where worn out and older material may become more rough or smoother, changing the sliding friction.
- Construction of the drive-pulley system – This involves strength and stability of the material used, like the pulley, and how greatly it will oppose the motion of the belt or rope.
- Conditions under which the belt and pulleys are operating – The friction between the belt and pulley may decrease substantially if the belt happens to be muddy or wet, as it may act as a lubricant between the surfaces. This also applies to extremely dry or warm conditions which will evaporate any water naturally found in the belt, nominally making friction greater.
- Overall design of the setup – The setup involves the initial conditions of the construction, such as the angle which the belt is wrapped around and geometry of the belt and pulley system.

== Applications ==
An understanding of belt friction is essential for sailing crews and mountain climbers. Their professions require being able to understand the amount of weight a rope with a certain tension capacity can hold versus the amount of wraps around a pulley. Too many revolutions around a pulley make it inefficient to retract or release rope, and too few may cause the rope to slip. Misjudging the ability of a rope and capstan system to maintain the proper frictional forces may lead to failure and injury.

== See also ==
- Capstan equation
- Frictional contact mechanics
