= Kirchhoff equations =

Motion of rigid body in ideal fluid

In fluid dynamics, the Kirchhoff equations, named after Gustav Kirchhoff, describe the motion of a rigid body in an ideal fluid.

$$\begin{align}
{\mathrm{d}\over\mathrm{d}t} {{\partial T}\over{\partial \boldsymbol\omega}}
& = {{\partial T}\over{\partial \boldsymbol\omega}} \times \boldsymbol\omega + {{\partial
T}\over{\partial \mathbf v}} \times \mathbf v + \mathbf Q_h + \mathbf Q, \\[10pt]
{\mathrm{d}\over\mathrm{d}t} {{\partial T}\over{\partial \mathbf v}}
& = {{\partial T}\over{\partial \mathbf v}} \times \boldsymbol\omega + \mathbf F_h + \mathbf F, \\[10pt]
T &  = {1 \over 2} \left( \boldsymbol\omega^T \tilde I \boldsymbol\omega + m v^2 \right) \\[10pt]
\mathbf Q_h & = -\int p \mathbf x \times\hat\mathbf n \, d\sigma, \\[10pt]
\mathbf F_h & = -\int p \hat\mathbf n \, d\sigma
\end{align}$$

where $\boldsymbol\omega$ and $\mathbf v$ are the angular and linear velocity vectors at the point $\mathbf x$, respectively; $\tilde I$ is the moment of inertia tensor, $m$ is the body's mass; $\hat\mathbf n$ is a unit normal vector to the surface of the body at the point $\mathbf x$; $p$ is a pressure at this point; $\mathbf Q_h$ and $\mathbf F_h$ are the hydrodynamic torque and force acting on the body, respectively; $\mathbf Q$ and $\mathbf F$ likewise denote all other torques and forces acting on the body. The integration is performed over the fluid-exposed portion of the body's surface.

If the body is completely submerged body in an infinitely large volume of irrotational, incompressible, inviscid fluid, that is at rest at infinity, then the vectors $\mathbf Q_h$ and $\mathbf F_h$ can be found via explicit integration, and the dynamics of the body is described by the Kirchhoff – Clebsch equations:

${\mathrm{d}\over\mathrm{d}t} {{\partial L}\over{\partial \boldsymbol\omega}} = {{\partial L}\over{\partial \boldsymbol\omega}} \times \boldsymbol\omega + {{\partial L}\over{\partial \mathbf v}} \times \mathbf v, \quad {\mathrm{d}\over\mathrm{d}t} {{\partial L}\over{\partial \mathbf v}} = {{\partial L}\over{\partial \mathbf v}} \times \boldsymbol\omega,$

$L(\boldsymbol\omega, \mathbf v) = {1 \over 2} (A \boldsymbol\omega,\boldsymbol\omega) + (B \boldsymbol\omega,\mathbf v) + {1 \over 2} (C \mathbf v,\mathbf v) + (\mathbf k,\boldsymbol\omega) + (\mathbf l,\mathbf v).$

Their first integrals read $J_0 = \left({{\partial L}\over{\partial \boldsymbol\omega}}, \boldsymbol\omega \right) + \left({{\partial L}\over{\partial \mathbf v}}, \mathbf v \right) - L, \quad J_1 = \left({{\partial L}\over{\partial \boldsymbol\omega}},{{\partial L}\over{\partial \mathbf v}}\right), \quad J_2 = \left({{\partial L}\over{\partial \mathbf v}},{{\partial L}\over{\partial \mathbf v}}\right) .$

Further integration produces explicit expressions for position and velocities.
