= Glossary of engineering =

This glossary is split across multiple pages due to technical limitations.

== By alphabetical order ==
- Glossary of engineering: A–L
- Glossary of engineering: M–Z

== By category ==
- Glossary of civil engineering
- Glossary of electrical and electronics engineering
- Glossary of mechanical engineering
- Glossary of structural engineering
- Glossary of aerospace engineering
