= List of engineering branches =

Disciplines into which the field of engineering is conventionally divided

Engineering is the discipline and profession that applies scientific theories, mathematical methods, and empirical evidence to design, create, and analyze technological solutions, balancing technical requirements with concerns or constraints on safety, human factors, physical limits, regulations, practicality, and cost, and often at an industrial scale. In the contemporary era, the major primary branches of engineering generally include: biomedical engineering, chemical engineering, civil engineering, electrical engineering, materials engineering and mechanical engineering. There are numerous other engineering sub-disciplines and interdisciplinary subjects that may or may not be grouped with these major engineering branches.

== Biomedical engineering ==
Biomedical engineering is the application of engineering principles and design concepts to medicine and biology for healthcare applications (e.g., diagnostic or therapeutic purposes).

| Subdiscipline | Engineering scope | Major specialties |
|---|---|---|
| Bioinformatics | Data science within the scope of digital tools to collect and analyze biomedical data, such as DNA | Information engineering; Computational biology; Genomics; Molecular modelling; Systems analysis; Database management |
| Bioinstrumentation | Electronics & Measurement within the scope of devices and tools that are used in the diagnosis and treatment of disease, often overlapping with biotechnology | Neuroscience; Biomechatronics; Photonics; Instrumentation; Biosensors; Medical devices |
| Biomaterials | Materials science related to interfacing materials with or within the body | Ceramic engineering; Polymer engineering; Metalworking; Biocompatibility; Implant design; Drug delivery |
| Biomechanics | Mechanical systems involving kinematics, material deformation, artificial organs, transport of chemical substances across biological membranes, and flow related to biological substances inside and outside the body | Military engineering; Sports engineering; Rehabilitation engineering; Ergonomics; Prosthetics; Fluid dynamics; Accident reconstruction |
| Biomolecular engineering | Biological systems | Genetic engineering; Chemical engineering; Molecular engineering; Chemistry; Synthetic biology; Systems biology; Nanotechnology |
| Clinical engineering | Healthcare systems within the scope of hospital-related functions, including data management, instruments, and monitoring systems | Facilities engineering; Radiation protection; Project engineering; Healthcare technology management; Logistics; Cybersecurity |
| Medical imaging | Visualization systems for biological systems, such as MRI, EEG, PET, and CT | Image processing; Computer vision; Signal processing; Medical physics; 3D reconstruction; Artificial intelligence |
| Neural engineering | Brain–computer interface related to recording and processing signals from brain activity for diagnostic and therapeutic purposes, often with the goal of replacing/restoring lost sensorimotor abilities | Neuromodulation; Neuroprosthetics; Cognitive engineering; Signal processing; Biosignal processing; Neurochips; Neurorobotics |
| Pharmaceutical engineering | Process architecture within the scope of pharmaceuticals and drug delivery | Process engineering; Project engineering; Manufacturing; Drug design; Quality control; Scalability |
| Regenerative medicine | Tissue systems | Tissue engineering; Cellular engineering; Tissue culture; 3D bioprinting; Stem cell therapy |

== Chemical engineering ==
Chemical engineering is the application of chemical, physical, and biological sciences to developing technological solutions from raw materials or chemicals.

| Subdiscipline | Engineering scope | Major specialties |
|---|---|---|
| Electrochemical engineering | Large-scale electrosynthesis of chemicals, electrowinning and chemical energy storage | |
| Explosives engineering | | |
| Molecular engineering | Chemical behavior and interactions at a molecular level | Biomolecular engineering – for biological systems; Genetic engineering – modification and manipulation of genes |
| Process engineering | Chemical processes at an industrial level | |

== Civil engineering ==
Civil engineering comprises the design, construction, and maintenance of the physical and natural built environments.

| Subdiscipline | Engineering scope | Major specialties |
|---|---|---|
| Environmental engineering | Applications of environmental science | Ecological engineering – design, monitoring, and construction of ecosystems; Fire protection engineering – as applied to the outdoor environment and wildfires; Natural resources engineering; Sanitary engineering – separation and removal of community sewage; increasingly interdisciplinary as a branch of environmental engineering |
| Geotechnical engineering | The behavior of earth materials and soil and rock mechanics, often in preparation of a project site | Geoprofessions |
| Municipal or urban engineering | The coordination and management of municipal infrastructure networks | |
| Structural engineering | Structures that support or resist structural loads. | Architectural engineering – building design and construction; Construction engineering – construction procedures and management; Earthquake engineering – structures subject to seismic loading; Ocean engineering – offshore structures; Pavement engineering – road structures subject to dynamic loading; Wind engineering – structures subject to wind effects; Tropical cyclone engineering – hurricane-force winds and emergency preparedness |
| Transport engineering | Facilities and infrastructure for any form of transportation of people and cargo | Railway engineering – rail transport; Traffic engineering – roadways; Bicycle transportation engineering – cycling infrastructure; Highway engineering – major roadways |
| Water resources engineering | Technical application of hydrology | Coastal engineering – construction within the coastal zone, often directed at combating erosion and storm surges; Hard and soft engineering of shorelines; Groundwater engineering – modifying groundwater by withdrawing or adding fluids; Hydraulic engineering – supply and drainage of fluids; River engineering – modification of a river's course, flow, or other characteristics |

== Electrical engineering ==
Electrical engineering comprises the study and application of electricity, electronics and electromagnetism.

| Subdiscipline | Engineering scope | Major specialties |
|---|---|---|
| Broadcast engineering | Radio and television broadcasting | Radio-frequency engineering – radio-band signal devices |
| Computer engineering | Electronic computing devices | Algorithm engineering; Computational engineering – computational engineering models (CEM); Cybersecurity engineering; Data engineering – systems which collect and use vast amounts of data; Hardware engineering – physical computer equipment; Information engineering – generation, distribution, analysis, and use of information in systems; Network engineering; Software engineering – application of computer science to software; Teletraffic engineering – transportation traffic theory applied to telecommunications |
| Electronic engineering | Low-power electrical circuits using of active components such as semiconductor devices | Control engineering – regulation of automated systems through sensors and corrective feedback; Electronics denotes a broad engineering field that covers subfields such as analog electronics, digital electronics, consumer electronics, embedded systems and power electronics. Electronics engineering deals with the implementation of applications, principles, and algorithms developed within many related fields, for example solid-state physics, radio engineering, telecommunications, control systems, signal processing, systems engineering, computer engineering, instrumentation engineering, electric power control, robotics, and many others; Instrumentation engineering – automated measurements; Signal processing – analysis, modifying and synthesizing electronic signals; Telecommunications engineering – processing and transmitting information through wired or wireless communications |
| Microwave engineering | Devices operating at microwave frequencies | Microwave imaging; Radar engineering; RF microwave engineering |
| Optical engineering | Technologies that utilize light | Optoelectronics; Optomechanics; Photonics |
| Power engineering | Generation and distribution of electric power | High voltage engineering, involves the understanding of electromagnetic phenomena of large voltages and currents (such as partial discharge), as applied to the holistic power system design and its components, such as transformers, electric motors, electric generators, switchgear, to create coordination and harmony; Power plant engineering; Power system design, the development of a specific solution to address a power need, such as a new substation, a new power line, power system protection and so on; Power system operations and control, involves plant and system operation, where protocols for the safe and continuous operation of individual equipment, subsystems, power plants, or the whole power system are developed and applied; Power system planning, involves the modelling of power systems to analyse the management of current and future electricity demand; Protection and control, involves the design of power system protection, measurements, metering, telecommunications, and so on |

== Materials engineering ==
Materials engineering is the application of material science and engineering principles to understand the properties of materials. Material science emerged in the mid-20th century, grouping together fields which had previously been considered unrelated. Materials engineering is thus much more interdisciplinary than the other major engineering branches.

| Subdiscipline | Engineering scope | Major specialties |
|---|---|---|
| Biomaterial | Materials implanted in the body | |
| Ceramic engineering | Inorganic, non-metallic materials | |
| Composite material engineering | Composite materials, materials with two or more macroscopic phases | |
| Computational materials science | The use of modeling, simulation, theory, and informatics to understand materials | Electronic structure – analysis of electron energies and spatial distribution; Density functional theory – method of calculating material properties; Molecular dynamics – simulation of atomic movements and resulting material changes; Phase field models – continuum treatments of interfaces, properties and their evolution |
| Corrosion engineering | Management and measurement of corrosion | |
| Electronic materials | Semiconductors and other electronic materials | |
| Forensic materials engineering | Analysis of material evidence to identify materials, determine the cause of failure, or reconstruct a crime or accident | |
| Material characterisation | Methods of investigating material structure and properties | Electron diffraction; Electron Microscopy; Spectroscopy; X-ray diffraction |
| Metallurgical engineering | Metals including alloys, typically excluding polymer or ceramics | Metal alloys – combinations of elements that results in a metal; Metal working – industrial fabrication of metallic materials |
| Nanotechnology | Nanoscale materials, dimensions less than 100 nm | Biomedical nanoengineering – nanomedicine; Electronic nanoengineering – nanoelectronics; Instrumentation engineering – as applied to nanosensors; Materials nanoengineering – nanomaterials; Nanoengineering – application of nanotechnology to traditional engineering fields |
| Polymer engineering | Polymer materials | |
| Surface engineering | Surfaces of solid materials | Tribology – friction and wear of surfaces in relative motion |
| Welding engineering | Permanent joining of metallic and non-metallic materials using heat, pressure, or both, with or without filler materials | Fusion welding – arc welding, laser welding, electron beam welding; Solid-state welding – friction welding, friction stir welding, diffusion bonding; Resistance welding – spot, seam, projection welding; Brazing and soldering – joining using filler metals below base material melting point; Welding metallurgy – microstructural evolution, phase transformations, heat-affected zone (HAZ); Welding processes and automation – robotic welding, additive manufacturing (Wire Arc AM); Weld design and structural integrity – joint design, residual stresses, distortion; Weld inspection and quality assurance – non-destructive testing (NDT), weld defects, standards and codes |

== Mechanical engineering ==
Mechanical engineering comprises the design and analysis of heat and mechanical power for the operation of machines and mechanical systems.

| Subdiscipline | Engineering scope | Major specialties |
|---|---|---|
| Acoustical engineering | Analysis and control of vibration and sound | Architectural acoustics; Bioacoustics – sound production and reception in animals; Noise control; Psychoacoustics; Underwater acoustics; Vibration control |
| Energy engineering | Energy systems, with an emphasis on efficiency and sustainability | |
| Industrial plant engineering | Industrial machines and equipment | Air compressors; Conveyors; Escalators; Fans and blowers; Hydraulics; Piping systems; Pneumatics; Pumps |
| Manufacturing engineering | Technologies, practices and systems for manufacturing | Cutting; Electrical discharge machining; Metalworking; Woodworking |
| Optomechanical engineering | Mechanical aspects of optical systems | Cameras; Fiber optics; Laser systems; Optical instrumentation; Telescopes |
| Power plant engineering | Field of engineering that designs, constructs, and maintains different types of power plants. Serves as the prime mover to produce electricity. | Coal-fired power plants; Geothermal power plants; Hydroelectric power plants; Diesel engine (ICE) power plants; Solar power plants; Tidal power plants; Wind turbine power plants |
| Sports engineering | Sports equipment | |
| Thermal engineering | Heating or cooling of processes, equipment, and enclosed environments | Air conditioning; Heating, ventilating; Refrigeration |
| Vehicle engineering | Systems and equipment that propel and control vehicles | Aerospace engineering; Automotive engineering; Naval and marine engineering; Railway engineering |

== Interdisciplinary ==
| Discipline | Engineering scope | Major specialties |
|---|---|---|
| Agricultural engineering | Farm power and machinery, biological material processes, bioenergy, farm structures, and agricultural natural resources. | Aquaculture engineering, cultured aquatic species and their production systems; Biological systems engineering, a broad term to encompass aspects of agricultural and biological engineering; Biomechanical engineering; Bioprocess engineering, products from biological materials; Bioresource engineering; Biotechnological engineering; Ecological engineering, ecosystems; Food engineering, food processing, food machinery, packaging, ingredient manufacturing, instrumentation and control; Forest engineering; Natural resources engineering |
| Applied engineering | Systems integration, manufacturing and management. | Automation/control systems/mechatronics/robotics; Computer-aided drawing and design (CADD); Construction; Electronics; Graphics; Nanotechnology |
| Biological engineering | The application of principles of biology and the tools of engineering to create usable, tangible, economically viable products. | Bioacoustics; Biochemical engineering, processes that involve biological organisms or molecules such as bioreactors; Bioengineering; Biological systems engineering, a broad term to encompass aspects of agricultural and biological engineering; Biotechnical engineering; Biomolecular engineering; Bioresource engineering; Bioprocess engineering; Cellular engineering; Food engineering; Genetic engineering, manipulate genes in organisms; Food and biological process engineering; Microbiological engineering; Molecular engineering; Protein engineering, protein synthesis; Systems biology; Synthetic biology |
| Building services engineering | The design, installation, operation, and monitoring of the technical services in buildings in order to ensure a safe, comfortable, and environmentally friendly operation. | Architectural engineering; Mechanical engineering; Heating, ventilation and air conditioning; Refrigeration; Public health engineering: water services, drainage and plumbing; Electrical engineering; Lighting, including artificial and emergency lighting, low voltage systems, containment, distribution, distribution boards and switchgear; Lightning protection; Security, video and alarm systems; Escalators and lifts; Fire engineering, including fire detection and fire protection; Building façade engineering; Energy supply – gas, electricity and renewable sources |
| Design engineer | Engineering design process and engineering analysis in a wide range of fields from civil engineering to aerospace engineering. | Architectural design; Automotive design; Building information modeling; CAD technician; Computer-aided engineering; Computer-aided industrial design; Computer-aided manufacturing; Design for additive manufacturing; Ergonomic design; Integrated circuit design; Interior architect; Mechanical, electrical, and plumbing (MEP); Naval architecture; Packaging engineering; Printed circuit board design; Systems engineering design; User experience design (UX); User interface design (UI) |
| Electromechanics | Interaction of electrical and mechanical systems, e.g.: alternating-current electrical generators and motors | |
| Energy engineering | Energy efficiency, energy services, facility management, plant engineering, environmental compliance, and energy production. Energy efficiency of buildings and manufacturing processes, employing advances in lighting, insulation, and heating/cooling properties. | Solar engineering, photovoltaic systems, solar thermal systems; Wind engineering, wind turbines |
| Engineering physics | Application of advanced physics and mathematics to interdisciplinary engineering problems | Applied physics; Optical engineering; Materials science; Nanotechnology; Quantum engineering |
| Facilities engineering | Conditions of indoor environments | Aerobiological engineering – control of airborne pathogens and allergens; Building services engineering – focus on human comfort and energy efficiency; Fire protection engineering – as applied to the indoor environment |
| Geological engineering | Technical application of geology, often in support of a civil, mining, or environmental engineering project | Geophysical engineering – subsurface environments; Geoenvironmental and hydrogeological engineering – effects of man-made contamination of soil and water; Mineral and hydrocarbon exploration engineering |
| Geomatics engineering | The design, development, and operation of systems for collecting and analyzing spatial information about the land, the oceans, natural resources, and manmade features. | Survey engineering; Geodesy; Geospatial |
| Information engineering | Generation, distribution, analysis, and use of information, data and knowledge in systems. | Machine learning; Data science; Artificial intelligence; Control theory; Signal processing; Telecommunications; Image processing; Information theory; Computer vision; Natural language processing; Bioinformatics; Medical image computing; Autonomous robotics; Mobile robotics |
| Industrial engineering | Integration, management and optimization of complex systems of people, information, resources and technology | Component engineering, optimal components to be subsequently assembled into products; Construction engineering, buildings and other structures; Manufacturing engineering, tools, equipment, and processes; Methods engineering – roles of humans in the production process; Operations engineering – logistics and production management; Packaging engineering; Production engineering – tools, equipment, and processes; Project engineering – management of a complex project; Quality engineering – quality assurance and control; Reliability engineering – equipment service life; Safety engineering; Supply chain engineering or logistics engineering; Systems engineering – management of a complex system from design to decommissioning; Usability engineering – design for learnability and error-free use |
| Mechatronics engineering | Automation and robotics | Automation engineering; Robotics engineering; Instrumentation engineering; Optomechatronics engineering; Biomechatronics engineering; Avionics, the design of electronics and systems on board an aircraft or spacecraft |
| Military engineering | Fortifications, military transport routes and communication lines | Combat engineering |
| Mining engineering | An engineering discipline that involves the science, technology, and practice of extracting and processing minerals from a naturally occurring environment. | |
| Quantum engineering | The application of quantum theory to the design of materials and devices. Now gaining recognition as its own branch of engineering, but more traditionally associated with sub-disciplines of electrical and computer engineering, communications engineering, solid-state and semiconductor materials engineering, optical engineering, and engineering physics. | Quantum properties of nanomaterials, nanoelectronics and nano-scale devices; Semiconductor materials and semiconductor devices; Photonics and quantum optics; Quantum information systems and quantum cryptography; Quantum computing |
| Nuclear engineering | Terrestrial and marine nuclear power plants | Medical physics; Nuclear fuel; Nuclear reactor design and control systems; Radiation protection; Fusion Energy |
| Petroleum engineering | A field of engineering concerned with the activities related to the production of Hydrocarbons, which can be either crude oil or natural gas. Petroleum engineers focus on studying subsurface formation properties and design and selection of equipment to maximize economic recovery of hydrocarbons from subsurface reservoirs. Petroleum geology and geophysics focus on the provision of a static description of the hydrocarbon reservoir rock, while petroleum engineering focuses on estimation of the recoverable volume of this resource using a detailed understanding of the physical behavior of oil, water, and gas within porous rock at very high pressure. | Reservoir engineering, the flow of fluids in porous and permeable underground reservoirs and sub-surface stresses; Drilling engineering, well-drilling, cementation, and casing; Production engineering, design and selection of sub-surface equipment, surface facilities, and separation of well fluids |
| Project engineering | Project engineering includes all parts of the design of manufacturing or processing facilities, either new or modifications to and expansions of existing facilities. A "project" consists of a coordinated series of activities or tasks performed by engineers and designers. A small project may be under the direction of a project engineer. Large projects are typically under the direction of a project manager or management team. Project tasks typically consist of such things as performing calculations, writing specifications, preparing bids, reviewing equipment proposals and evaluating or selecting equipment, and developing and maintaining various lists (equipment and materials lists) and drawings (electrical, instrument, and piping schematics, physical layouts and other drawings used in construction). Some facilities have in-house staff to handle small projects, while some major companies have a department that does internal project engineering. Large projects are typically contracted out to project engineering companies. Staffing at engineering companies varies according to the workload and duration of employment may only last until an individual's tasks are completed. | Process engineering; Instrumentation and control engineering; Structural engineering; Environmental engineering |
| Software engineering | Software engineering the application of a systematic, disciplined, quantifiable approach to the development, operation, and maintenance of software and the study of these approaches; that is, the application of engineering and computer science to software. | Cryptographic Engineering is the discipline of using cryptography to solve human problems. Cryptography is typically applied when trying to ensure data confidentiality, to authenticate people or devices, or to verify data integrity in risky environments; Information technology engineering, (ITE) or information engineering methodology (IEM) is a software engineering approach to designing and developing information systems. It can also be considered as the generation, distribution, analysis, and use of information in systems; Teletraffic engineering Telecommunications traffic engineering, teletraffic engineering, or traffic engineering is the application of traffic engineering theory to telecommunications. Teletraffic engineers use their knowledge of statistics including queuing theory, the nature of traffic, their practical models, their measurements, and simulations to make predictions and to plan telecommunication networks such as a telephone network or the Internet. These tools and knowledge help provide reliable service at a lower cost; Web engineering focuses on the methodologies, techniques, and tools that are the foundation of Web application development and which support their design, development, evolution, and evaluation. Web engineering is multidisciplinary and encompasses contributions from diverse areas such as systems analysis and design, software engineering, hypermedia/hypertext engineering, requirements engineering, human-computer interaction, user interface, information technology engineering, information indexing and retrieval, testing, modeling and simulation, project management and graphic design and presentation |
| Supply chain engineering | Supply chain engineering concerns the planning, design, and operation of supply chains. | Logistics; Pricing; Production |
| Systems engineering | Systems engineering is an interdisciplinary field of engineering that focuses on how to design and manage complex engineering projects over their life cycles. Issues, such as reliability, logistics and coordination of different teams, evaluation measurement, and other disciplines become more difficult when dealing with large or complex projects. | Systems engineering deals with work-processes, optimization methods, and risk management tools. It overlaps technical and human-centered disciplines such as control engineering, industrial engineering, organizational studies, and project management. Systems engineering ensures that all likely aspects of a project or system are considered and integrated into a whole |
| Textile engineering | Textile engineering courses deal with the application of scientific and engineering principles to the design and control of all aspects of fiber, textile, and apparel processes, products, and machinery. These include natural and man-made materials, interaction of materials with machines, safety and health, energy conservation, and waste and pollution control. Additionally, students are given experience in plant design and layout, machine and wet process design and improvement, and designing and creating textile products. Throughout the textile engineering curriculum, students take classes from other engineering disciplines including mechanical, chemical, materials, and industrial engineering. | Fabric engineering; Industrial & production engineering; Wet process engineering; Yarn engineering |

== See also ==
- Outline of engineering
    - outline of chemical engineering
    - outline of electrical engineering
    - outline of computer engineering
    - outline of software engineering
- History of engineering
- Glossary of engineering: A–L
- Glossary of engineering: M–Z
- Category:Engineering disciplines
- Engineering techniques:
  - Computer-aided engineering
    - Model-driven engineering
  - Concurrent engineering
  - Engineering analysis
  - Engineering design process (engineering method)
  - Engineering mathematics
  - Engineering notation
  - Engineering optimization
  - Engineering statistics
  - Front-end engineering
  - Knowledge engineering
  - Life-cycle engineering
  - Redundancy (engineering)
  - Reverse engineering
  - Sustainable engineering
  - Traditional engineering
  - Value engineering
- Non-technical fields:
  - Cost engineering
  - Demographic engineering
  - Engineering management
  - Financial engineering
  - Market engineering
  - Memetic engineering
  - Political engineering
  - Sales engineering
  - Social engineering (political science)
  - Social engineering (security)
  - Tariff engineering
- Exploratory engineering – the design and analysis of hypothetical models of systems not feasible with current technologies
  - Astronomical engineering
  - Megascale engineering
  - Planetary engineering
- Engineering studies – the study of engineers
  - Engineering economics
  - Engineering ethics
    - Engineering law
  - Engineering psychology
  - Philosophy of engineering
