= Kennametal =

American supplier of tooling and industrial materials

Kennametal Inc.
- Type: Public
- Traded as: NYSE: KMT; BSE: 505890; S&P 600 component
- Industry: Metals
- Founded: 1938
- Headquarters: Pittsburgh, Pennsylvania
- Key people: Sanjay Chowbey, President and CEO
- Products: aggregates, metalworking, abrasive flow products, cutting tools, metallurgy, mining equipment, woodworking, fluid handling
- Revenue: ▲$2.36 billion USD (2026)
- Net income: ▲$342 million USD (2026)
- Number of employees: approximately 10,000 worldwide
- Website: www.kennametal.com

Kennametal, Inc. is an American manufacturer of high-performance cutting tools and engineered components used in the aerospace, defense, transportation and oil and gas drilling industries. Its customer base is global.

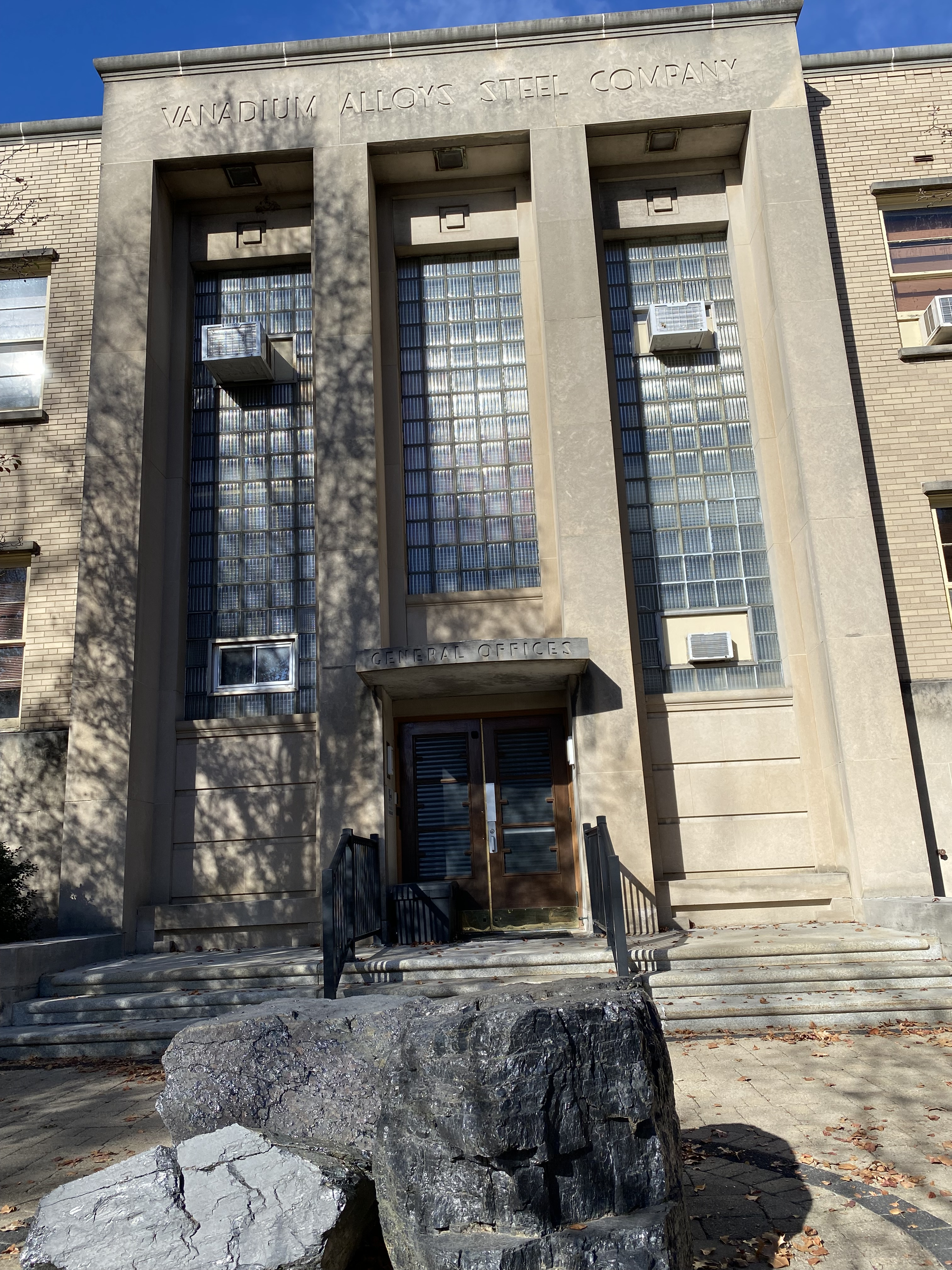
General office of predecessor firm Vanadium Alloys Steel; large lumps of coal in foreground

== History ==
Kennametal was founded in 1938 by Philip M. McKenna in the Latrobe, Pennsylvania area. The company evolved from Vanadium Alloys Steel Company (VASCO), founded in 1910 by the McKenna family with its headquarters in Latrobe, Pennsylvania. While research director of VASCO, metallurgist Philip McKenna developed and received a patent for a tungsten-titanium carbide composition. McKenna formed Kennametal, Inc. for the purpose of marketing this alloy.

The company's original flagship product, known as "Kennametal", was introduced in the late 1930s. It was described as "much harder than the hardest tool steel," which enabled high-rate steel cutting not possible previously. In July 1940, Kennametal of Canada Ltd. was organized for the purpose of "manufacturing Kennametal, the new steel cutting carbide, for Canada and British dominions." In November 1940, United States Steel Export Company reached an agreement to sell Kennametal tools, tool blanks, drawing dies and other Kennametal products in foreign markets.

During World War II, more than 50% of the artillery shells produced in the United States were machined with the Kennametal product. During this period the company developed a new type of anti-tank projectile made of tungsten with a hard carbide core.

The company has expanded through acquisitions, including the purchase of Widia Group (2002, 188 million Euros) Extrude Hone Corp. (2005, $137 million) and Allegheny Technologies' tungsten materials unit (2013, $605 million).

== Production ==
Kennametal products:

- Blades, disks, skins, fuel control systems, and landing gear for the aerospace industry
- Synthetic fertilizers for agriculture
- Camshafts, crankshafts, cylinder heads, rotors, calipers and differentials for automobiles
- Roofing and abrasives for home construction
- Asphalt, stabilization tools, and tunneling equipment for road construction
- Woodworking tools
- Machining industries:
  - Machine tools: Machining centers, turning centers (CNC lathes), automatic lathes (screw machines)
  - Tooling for machine tools:
    - Indexable toolholders, collets
    - fixtures
    - cutting tools (via WIDIA Products Group, a consolidation of various brands in this industry): inserts, tool bits, milling cutters, taps and dies, metal sawing cutters and tooling
- Mining equipment
- Abrasives and flow control for the oil industry
- Generating equipment for electric power plants
- Fluids for the paper industry
- Wheels and axles for rail transport
- Custom engineering

== Brands ==
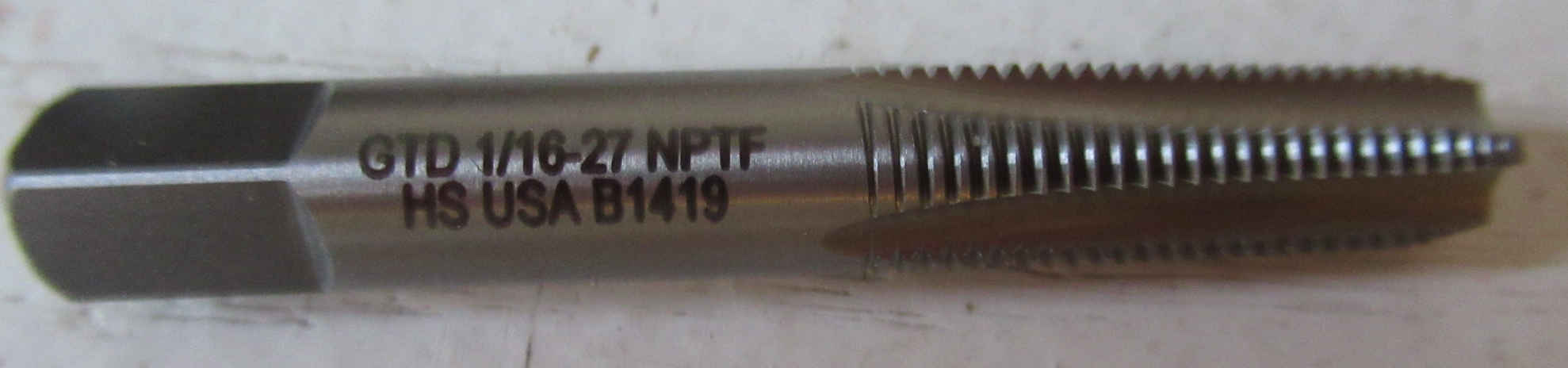
WIDIA GTD Tap 1/16-27 NPTF 4F Taper Pipe Tap

In 2009, Kennametal announced that they migrated all its current brands into two distinct portfolios: WIDIA Products Group and Kennametal Products Group.

=== WIDIA Products Group ===
This group markets several brands: WIDIA, Hanita, and WIDIA GTD. The GTD stands for Greenfield Tap & Die and was initially formed in 1912.

=== Kennametal Products Group ===
Kennametal Products Group provides metalworking tools, metal powders, and wear-resistant coatings such as Conforma-Clad and Stellite.

== Financial Results and Credit Rating ==
Kennametal's fiscal year ends on June 30. For fiscal years 2020 through 2024, results ranged from a loss of $5.66 million to net income of $118.46 million. With respect to the 2020 loss, the company said: "The effects of COVID-19 were felt in every region during the quarter and created a challenging environment." The company returned to profitability in the following fiscal year.

In September 2024, Moody's Ratings affirmed Kennametal's Baa3 credit rating, and opined that the outlook for the rating was "stable."

Net Income (Loss)
Year	$ millions
2020	($ 5.66)
2021	$ 54.43
2022	$ 114.62
2023	$ 118.46
2024	$ 109.32

== See also ==
- Stellite
