= Shohreh Bayat =

Iranian chess arbiter (born 1987)

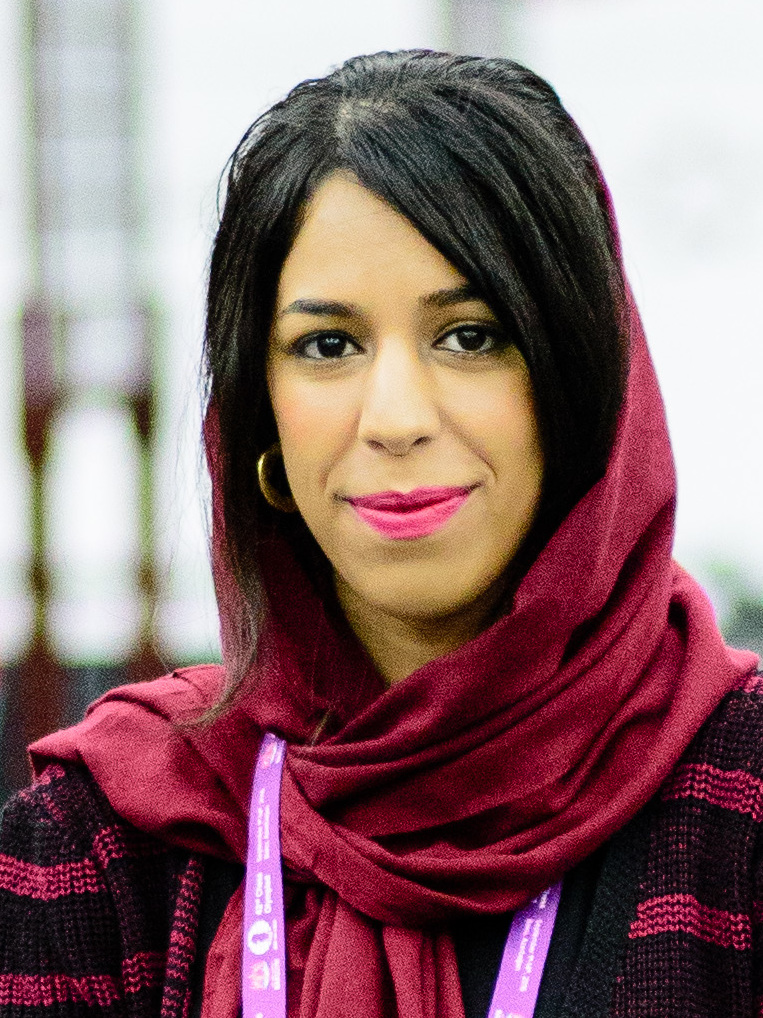
- Bayat in 2016

Personal information
- Born: March 14, 1987 (age 39) Rasht, Iran

Chess career
- Country: Iran (until October 2020); England (November 2020–present)
- Title: Woman FIDE Master (2006); Chess arbiter International Women of Courage Award (2021)
- Peak rating: 2104 (July 1999)

Shohreh Bayat (Persian: شهره بیات; born 1987) is an Iranian chess arbiter based in England. She was chief arbiter of the Women's World Chess Championship 2020. Bayat is an International Arbiter for FIDE. She was awarded an International Women of Courage Award in 2021.

== Early life and education ==
Bayat was born in 1987 in Rasht, Iran. Her Jewish paternal grandmother emigrated to Iran from Baku, Azerbaijan during World War II. They kept their Jewish ancestry hidden. She became the Iranian girls under-12 champion in 1998.

Bayat completed a master's degree in natural resources engineering

== Career ==
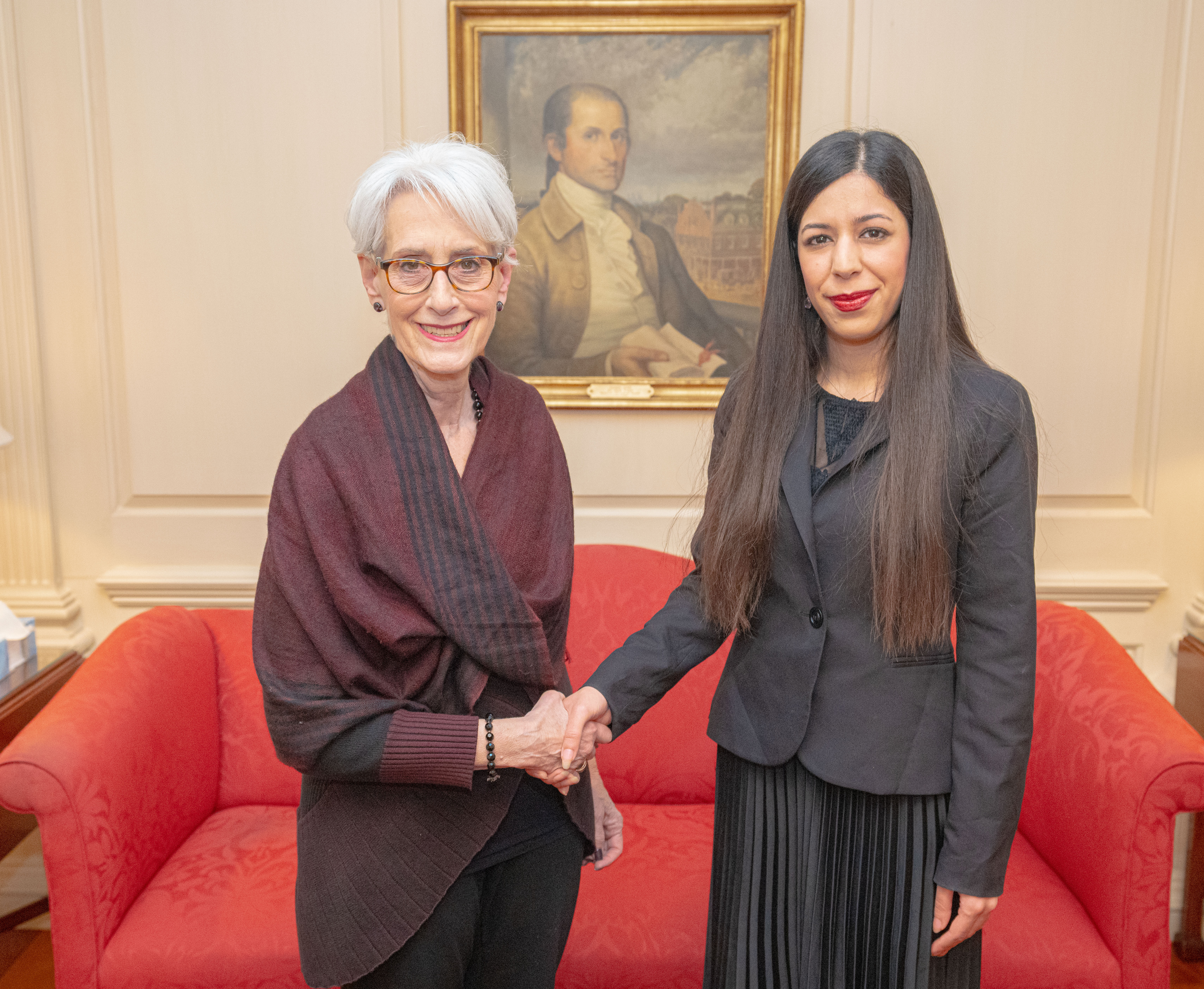
Bayat with US Deputy Secretary of State Wendy Sherman in 2022

At the age of 25, Bayat began a career as a chess arbiter with the FIDE. Bayat is one of the first Grade A arbiters from Asia and was a prominent figure in Iran's chess scene. She served as the chief arbiter of the Women's World Chess Championship 2020 (WWCC). A photograph of Bayat at the WWCC with her hijab around her neck generated controversy in Iran which enforces a strict Islamic dress code. The Chess Federation of Iran requested Bayat take a replacement picture wearing a hijab and issue an apology through social media. Bayat refused because she believes compulsory laws mandating wearing hijabs are misogynistic. In September 2020, she received confirmation from FIDE that she could referee under the English flag.

== Awards and honors ==
Bayat was awarded an International Women of Courage Award in 2021 for being a champion for women’s rights and ignoring the Iranian government threats.

== Personal life ==
Bayat is married and has family in Iran. In January 2020, she flew to England from Russia to seek asylum. Bayat had previously received a British visa for a chess tournament in Gibraltar.
