= RAWP =

RAWP may mean:

- a remedial action workplan in Environmental engineering law
- The Resource Allocation Working Party, established in the British NHS
