= Contagious disease =

Infectious disease readily spread by pathogen transmission

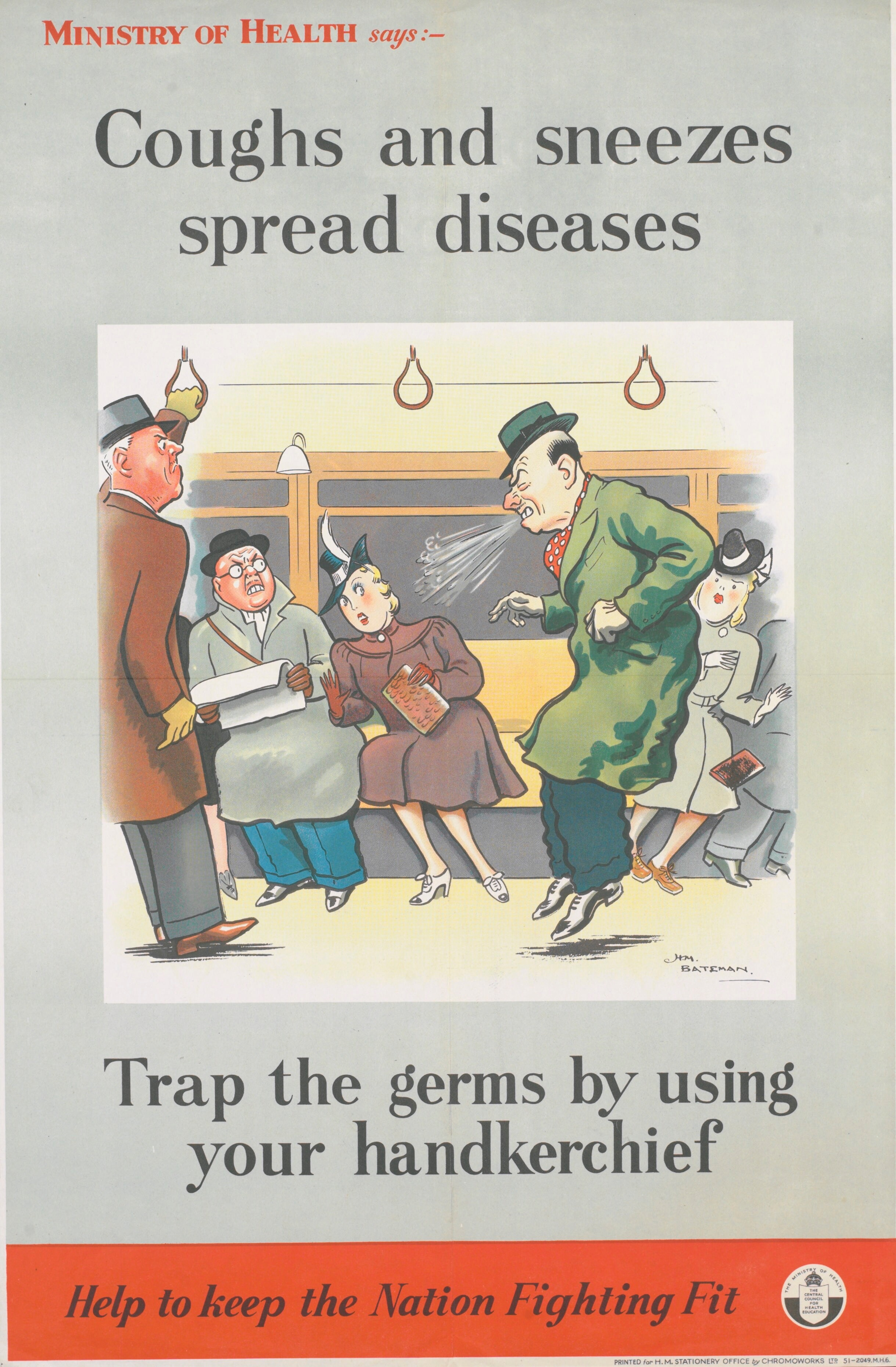
A public health poster: Coughs and sneezes spread diseases

A contagious disease is an infectious disease that can be spread rapidly in several ways, including direct contact, indirect contact, and droplet contact.

These diseases are caused by organisms such as parasites, bacteria, fungi, and viruses. Many types of organisms live on the human body and they can sometimes cause disease.

Some common infectious diseases known to be contagious are influenza, COVID-19, ebola, hepatitis, HIV/AIDS, Human papillomavirus infection, Polio, and Zika virus.

A disease is often known to be contagious before medical science discovers its causative agent. Koch's postulates, which were published at the end of the 19th century, were the standard for the next 100 years or more, especially with diseases caused by bacteria. Microbial pathogenesis attempts to account for diseases caused by a virus.

== Historical meaning ==
Originally, the term referred to a contagion or disease transmissible only by direct physical contact. In the modern-day, the term has sometimes been broadened to encompass any communicable or infectious disease. Often the word can only be understood in context, where it is used to emphasize very infectious, easily transmitted, or especially severe communicable diseases.

In 1849, John Snow first proposed that cholera was a contagious disease.

== Effect on public health response ==
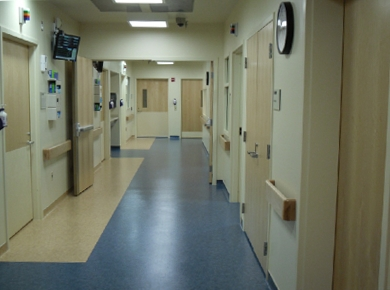
This clinic uses negative room pressure to prevent disease transmission

Most epidemics are caused by contagious diseases, with occasional exceptions, such as yellow fever. The spread of non-contagious communicable diseases is changed either very little or not at all by medical isolation of ill persons or medical quarantine for exposed persons. Thus, a "contagious disease" is sometimes defined in practical terms, as a disease for which isolation or quarantine are useful public health responses.

Some locations are better suited for the research into the contagious pathogens due to the reduced risk of transmission afforded by a remote or isolated location.

The basic reproduction number of a disease is used to measure how easily the disease spreads through contact with infected individuals.

Negative room pressure is a technique in health care facilities based on aerobiological designs.

== See also ==
- Germ theory of disease
- Herd immunity
- Notifiable disease
