= Wind engineering =

Study of the effects of wind on natural and built environments

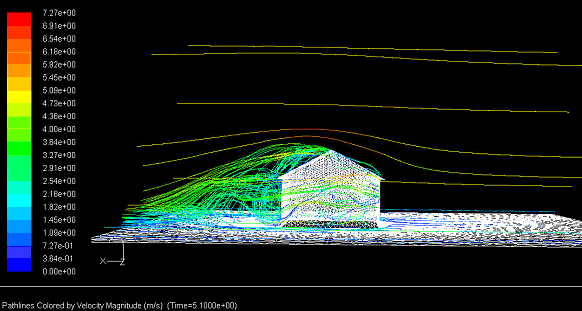
Flow visualization of wind speed contours around a house

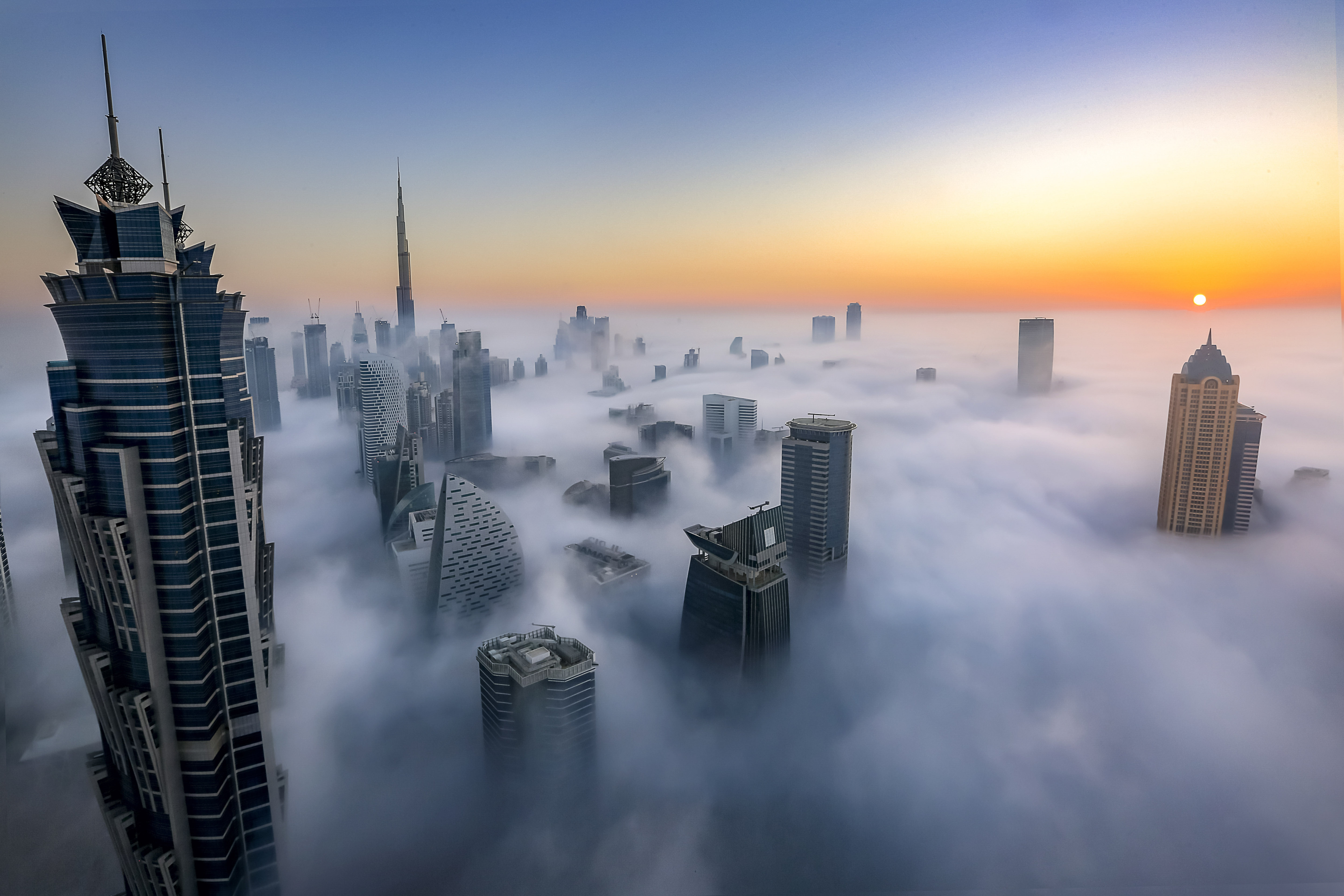
Wind engineering covers the aerodynamic effects of buildings

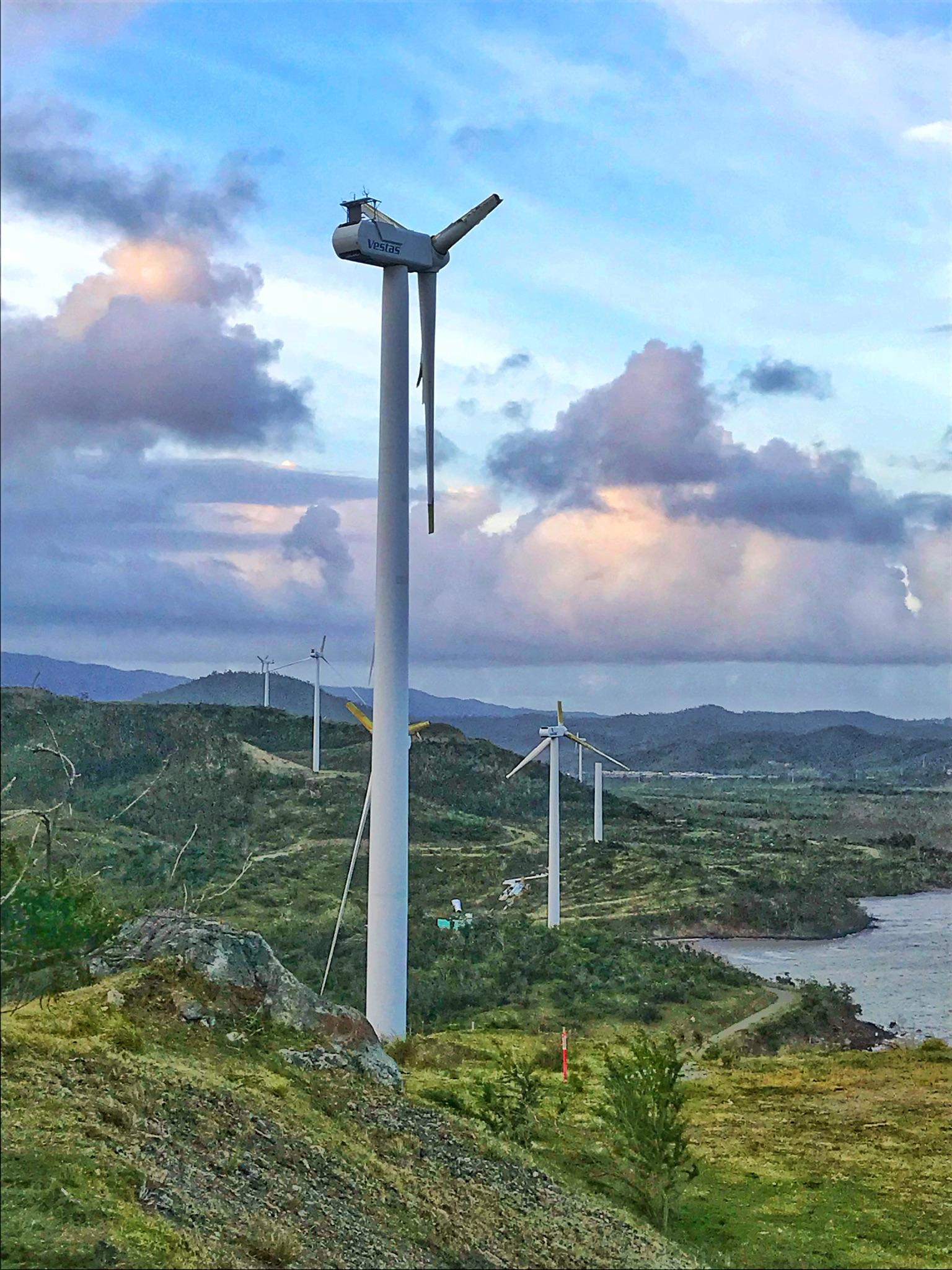
Damaged wind turbines due to hurricane Maria

Wind engineering is a subset of mechanical engineering, structural engineering, meteorology, and applied physics that analyzes the effects of wind in the natural and the built environment and studies the possible damage, inconvenience or benefits which may result from wind. In the field of engineering it includes strong winds, which may cause discomfort, as well as extreme winds, such as in a tornado, hurricane or heavy storm, which may cause widespread destruction. In the fields of wind energy and air pollution it also includes low and moderate winds as these are relevant to electricity production and dispersion of contaminants.

Wind engineering draws upon meteorology, fluid dynamics, mechanics, geographic information systems, and a number of specialist engineering disciplines, including aerodynamics and structural dynamics. The tools used include atmospheric models, atmospheric boundary layer wind tunnels, and computational fluid dynamics models.

Wind engineering involves, among other topics:

- Wind impact on structures (buildings, bridges, towers)
- Wind comfort near buildings
- Effects of wind on the ventilation system in a building
- Wind climate for wind energy
- Air pollution near buildings

Wind engineering may be considered by structural engineers to be closely related to earthquake engineering and explosion protection.

Some sports stadiums such as Candlestick Park and Arthur Ashe Stadium are known for their strong, sometimes swirly winds, which affect the playing conditions.

== History ==
Wind engineering as a separate discipline can be traced to the UK in the 1960s, when informal meetings were held at the National Physical Laboratory, the Building Research Establishment, and elsewhere. The term "wind engineering" was first coined in 1970. Alan Garnett Davenport was one of the most prominent contributors to the development of wind engineering. He is well known for developing the Alan Davenport wind-loading chain or in short "wind-loading chain" that describes how different components contribute to the final load calculated on the structure.

== Wind loads on buildings ==
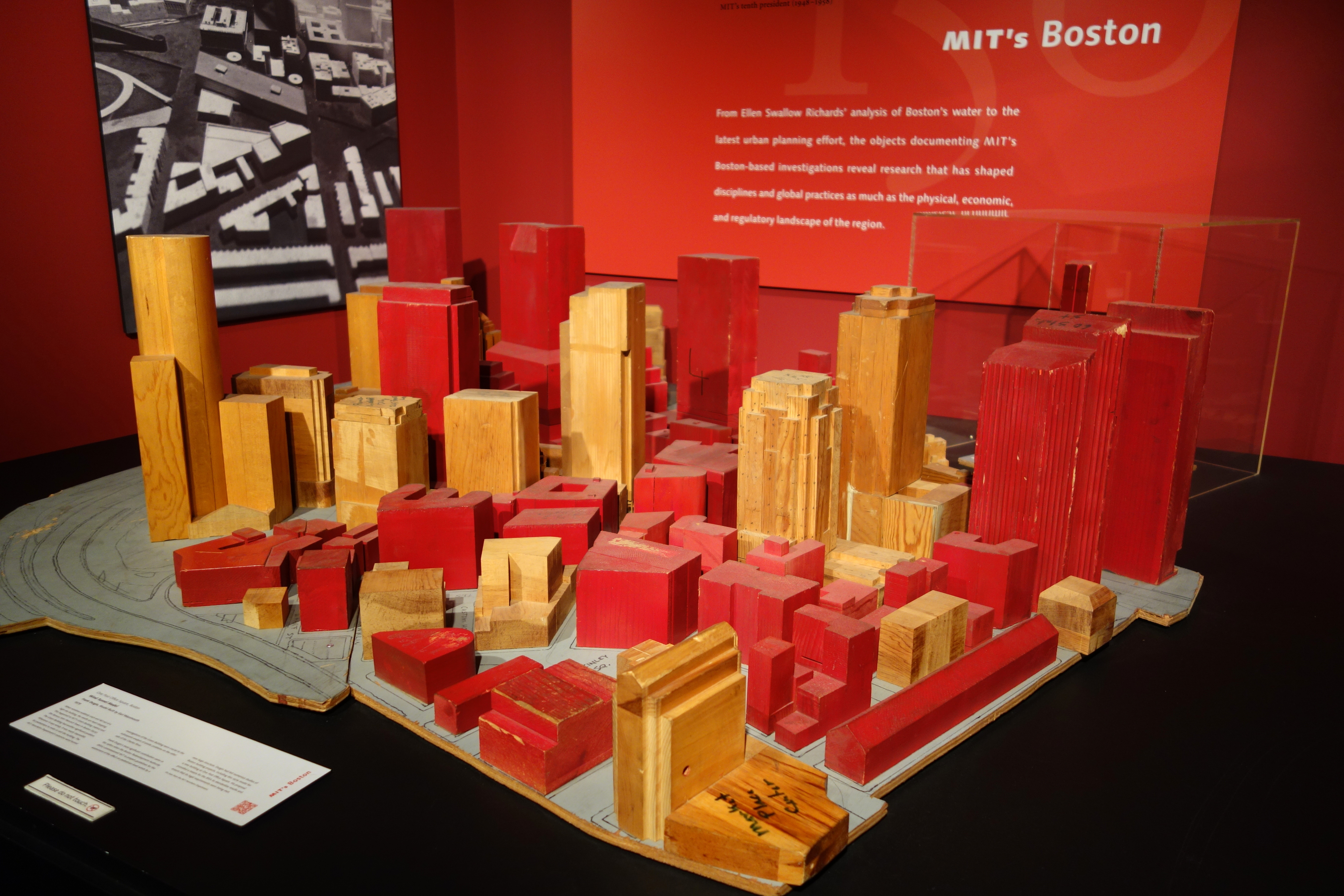
Wind Tunnel Model of One Post Office Square, Boston

The design of buildings must account for wind loads, and these are affected by wind shear. For engineering purposes, a power law wind-speed profile may be defined as:

$$\ v_z = v_g \cdot \left( \frac {z} {z_g} \right)^ \frac {1} {\alpha}, 0 < z < z_g$$

where:

$\ v_z$ = speed of the wind at height $\ z$
$\ v_g$ = gradient wind at gradient height $\ z_g$
$\ \alpha$ = exponential coefficient

Typically, buildings are designed to resist a strong wind with a very long return period, such as 50 years or more. The design wind speed is determined from historical records using extreme value theory to predict future extreme wind speeds. Wind speeds are generally calculated based on some regional design standard or standards. The design standards for building wind loads include:

- AS 1170.2 for Australia
- EN 1991-1-4 for Europe
- NBC for Canada

== Wind comfort ==
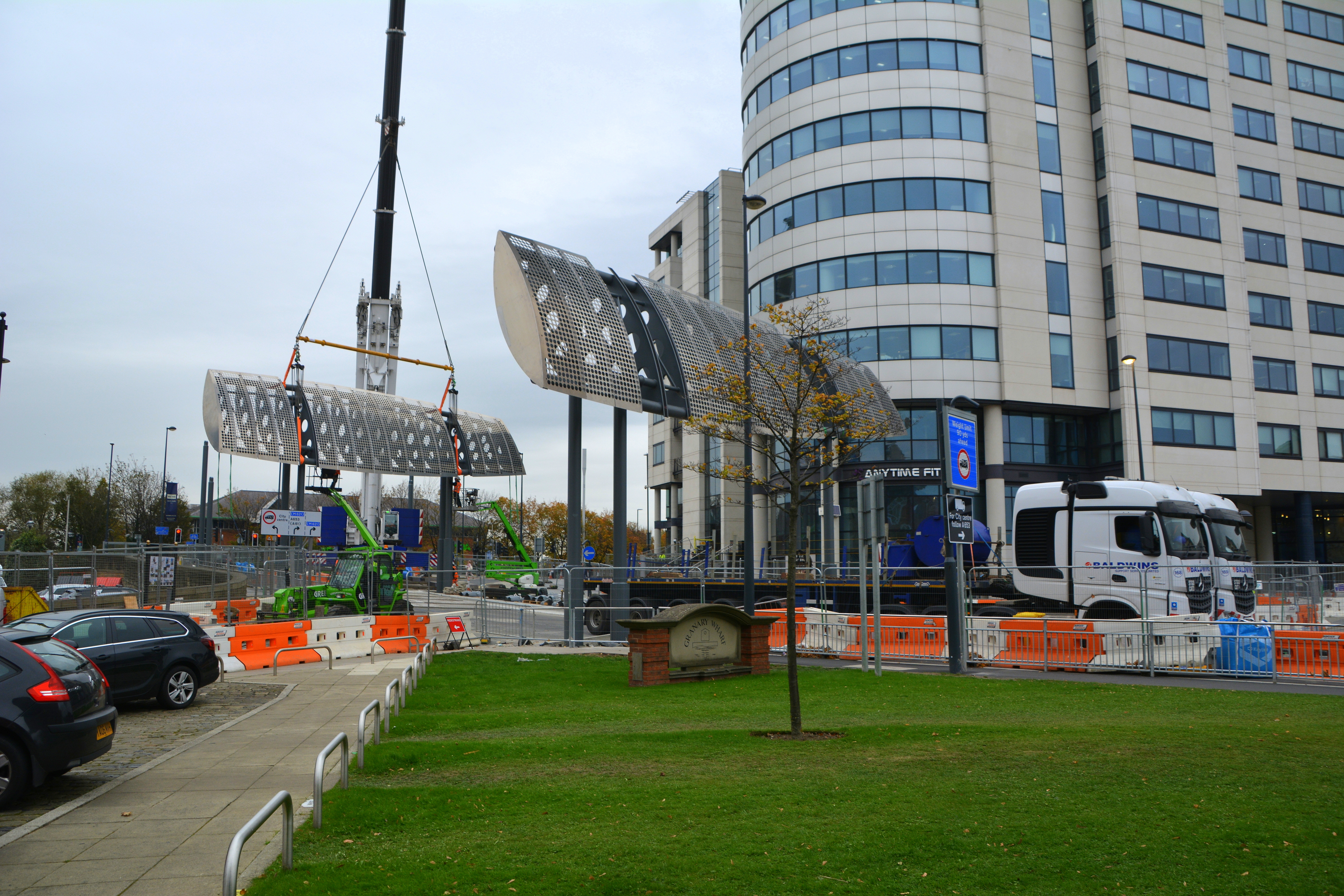
Wind baffles being installed to mitigate wind danger issues at the Bridgewater Place skyscraper in Leeds, UK

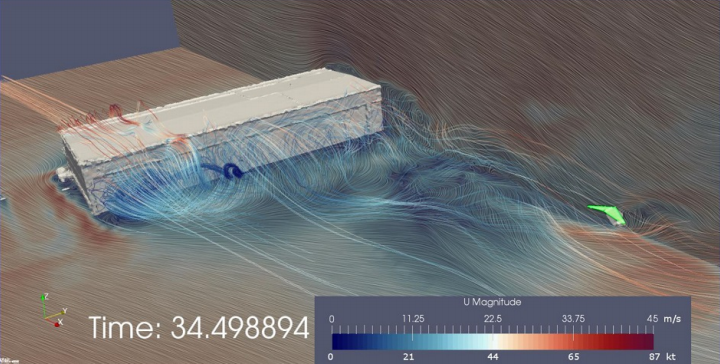
Computer simulation of the airflow downwind of a hangar which caused damage to Ameristar Charters Flight 9363

The advent of high-rise tower blocks led to concerns regarding the wind nuisance caused by these buildings to pedestrians in their vicinity.

A number of wind comfort and wind danger criteria were developed from 1971, based on different pedestrian activities, such as:

- Sitting for a long period of time
- Sitting for a short period of time
- Strolling
- Walking fast

Other criteria classified a wind environment as completely unacceptable or dangerous.

Building geometries consisting of one and two rectangular buildings have a number of well-known effects:

- Corner streams, also known as corner jets, around the corners of buildings
- Through-flow, also known as a passage jet, in any passage through a building or small gap between two buildings due to pressure short-circuiting
- Vortex shedding in the wake of buildings

For more complex geometries, pedestrian wind comfort studies are required. These can use an appropriately scaled model in a boundary-layer wind tunnel, or more recently, use of computational fluid dynamics techniques has increased. The pedestrian level wind speeds for a given exceedance probability are calculated to allow for regional wind speeds statistics.

The vertical wind profile used in these studies varies according to the terrain in the vicinity of the buildings (which may differ by wind direction), and is often grouped in categories, such as:

- Exposed open terrain with few or no obstructions and water surfaces at serviceability wind speeds
- Water surfaces, open terrain, grassland with few, well-scattered obstructions having heights generally from 1.5 to 10 m
- Terrain with numerous closely spaced obstructions 3 to 5 m high, such as areas of suburban housing
- Terrain with numerous large, high (10 to 30 m high) and closely spaced obstructions, such as large city centres and well-developed industrial complexes

== Wind turbines ==
Wind turbines are affected by wind shear. Vertical wind-speed profiles result in different wind speeds at the blades nearest to the ground level compared to those at the top of blade travel, and this, in turn, affects the turbine operation. The wind gradient can create a large bending moment in the shaft of a two bladed turbine when the blades are vertical. The reduced wind gradient over water means shorter and less expensive wind turbine towers can be used in shallow seas.

For wind turbine engineering, wind speed variation with height is often approximated using a power law:

$$\ v_w(h) = v_{ref} \cdot \left( \frac {h} {h_{ref}} \right)^ a$$

where:

$\ v_w(h)$ = velocity of the wind at height $h$ [m/s]
$\ v_{ref}$ = velocity of the wind at some reference height $h_{ref}$ [m/s]
$\ a$ = Hellman exponent (a.k.a. power law exponent or shear exponent) (~= 1/7 in neutral flow, but can be >1)

== Significance ==
The knowledge of wind engineering is used to analyze and design all high-rise buildings, cable-suspension bridges and cable-stayed bridges, electricity transmission towers and telecommunication towers and all other types of towers and chimneys. The wind load is the dominant load in the analysis of many tall buildings, so wind engineering is essential for their analysis and design. Again, wind load is a dominant load in the analysis and design of all long-span cable bridges.

== See also ==
- Hurricane engineering
- John Twidell
- Vibration control
- Wind tunnel testing
- World Wind Energy Association
- Damping
- Alan G. Davenport
