= John Twidell =

John Twidell is a former director of the AMSET Centre Ltd. and a former visiting lecturer at the Environmental Change Institute, University of Oxford, and the School of Aeronautics and Engineering, City University, London. He was Editor of the academic journal Wind Engineering. He co-edited the 2009 book Offshore Wind Power.

Professor Twidell previously held the Chair in Renewable Energy at De Montfort University and was Director of the Energy Studies Unit of Strathclyde University. He served on the Boards of the British Wind Energy Association (now RenewableUK) and the UK Solar Energy Society, on committees of the Institute of Physics and as an adviser to the UK Parliamentary Select Committee on Energy. He has been a long-standing champion of wind energy.

== Select bibliography ==
- Twidell, John; Weir, Tony (24 November 2005). Renewable Energy Resources (Second ed.). Taylor & Francis. ISBN 978-0-419-25320-4.
- Twidell, John (2022). Renewable Energy Resources (Fourth ed.). Routledge. ISBN 978-1-138-32226-4.
