= Aerobiological engineering =

Aerobiological engineering is the science of designing buildings and systems to control airborne pathogens and allergens in indoor environments. The most-common environments include commercial buildings, residences and hospitals. This field of study is important because controlled indoor climates generally tend to favor the survival and transmission of contagious human pathogens as well as certain kinds of fungi and bacteria.

== Aerobiological engineering in healthcare facilities ==
Since healthcare facilities can house a number of different types of patients who potentially have weakened immune systems, aerobiological engineering is of significant importance to engineers of hospitals. The aerobiology that concerns designers of hospitals includes viruses, bacteria, fungi, and other microbiological products such as endotoxins, mycotoxins, and microbial volatile organic compounds (MVOC's). Bacteria and viruses, because of their small size, readily become airborne as bacterial aerosols . Even large-sized droplets can remain suspended in the air for long periods if upward velocity of air in closed spaces exceed particle's downward velocity as dictated by their negligible mass. Because of this, adequate precautions and mitigation techniques need to be taken with indoor air quality in hospitals dealing with infectious diseases.

=== Ventilation systems ===
At a minimum, ventilation systems provide dilution and removal of airborne contaminants, which in general leads to improved indoor air quality and happier occupants. If filters are checked and replaced as needed, they can form an integral component of an immune building system designed to prevent the spread of diseases by airborne routes. They can also be used for pressurization of areas within buildings to provide contamination control.

=== Biocontamination in ventilation systems ===
Ventilation systems can contribute to the microbial loading of indoor environment by drawing in microbes from outdoor air and by creating conditions for growth. When microbes land on a wet filter that has been collecting dust, they have the perfect medium on which to grow, and if they grow through the filter they have the potential to be aerosolized and carried throughout the building via the HVAC control system.

=== Dilution rates ===
Bacteria in hospitals can be aerosolized when sick patients cough and sneeze and because of the large number of germs produced it is necessary that the number of air changes per hour (ACH) remain high in treatment and operating rooms. The American Society of Heating, Refrigerating and Air-Conditioning Engineers typically recommends 12-25 ACH in treatment and operating rooms and 4-6 ACH in intensive-care rooms. For rooms containing tuberculosis patients, the Centers for Disease Control and Prevention recommends an ACH of 6 to 12, with exhaust air being sent through high-efficiency-particulate-air (HEPA) filters before being sent outside.

=== Pressurized isolation rooms ===
In order to keep patients safe, hospitals use a range of technologies to combat airborne pathogens. Isolation rooms can be designed to feature positive or negative air-pressure flows. Positive-pressure rooms are used when there are patients who are extremely susceptible to disease, such as HIV patients. For these patients, it is paramount to prevent the ingress of any microorganisms, including common fungi and bacteria that may be harmless to healthy people. These systems filter the air before delivery with a HEPA filter and then pump it into the isolation room at high pressure, which forces air from the isolation room out into the hallway. In a negative-pressure system, the focus is on keeping infectious diseases isolated by controlling the airflow and directing harmful aerosols away from health care workers and other occupied areas. Negative pressure isolation rooms keep contaminants and pathogens from reaching external areas. The most common application of these rooms in the health industry today is for isolating tuberculosis patients. To do this, the air is exhausted from the room at a rate greater than that at which it is being delivered. This makes it difficult for airborne disease to go from a contaminated area to a hospital hallway, because air is constantly being drawn into the room rather than escaping from it.

=== Air sterilization processes ===
The normal means for filtration in healthcare facilities is low-efficiency air filters outside the air-handling unit followed by the HEPA (High Efficiency Particulate Air) filters placed after the air-handling unit. To be HEPA-certified, filters must remove particles of 0.3 μm diameter, with at least a 99.97-percent efficiency. Air burners sterilize air that is leaving contaminated isolation rooms by heating it to 300 °C (572 °F) for six seconds. Ultraviolet germicidal irradiation (UVGI) is another technique for special-purpose air sterilization. It is defined as electromagnetic radiation in the range of about 200 to 320 nm, that is used to destroy microorganisms. When HEPA filters are used in conjunction with UV sterilization tools, the results can be extremely effective. The filter will remove the bigger, hardier spores, and all that is left are the smaller microbes which are killed more efficiently by the high-intensity UV treatment.

== See also ==
- Human habitat
- Human outpost (artificially created controlled human habitat)
- Legionnaires' disease
- Aerobiology
