= Market engineering =

Engineering system ensuring structural well-being of markets

Market engineering comprises the structured, systematic and theoretically founded procedure of analyzing, designing, introducing and also quality assurance of markets as well as their legal framework regarding their market mechanisms and trading rules, systems, platforms and media, as well as their business models. In this context, the term market stands for a set of rules defining the exchange of information between participants at minimal cost. Market engineering borrows concepts and methods from economics, particularly, Game Theory, and Mechanism Design concepts, but also borrows concepts from Finance, Information Systems and Operations Research. It finds particular application in the context of electronic market platforms.

== Framework ==
The Market Engineering Framework takes into account the various aspects of market engineering. The Market Engineering Framework diagram depicts the building blocks that form the framework. The framework operates in the economic and legal environment in which it is situated. This effects the operations of all other portions of the framework. The transaction object represents the interface between market operators and the individual components of the market (market microstructure, IT infrastructure and the business infrastructure) (Weinhardt et al. 2003, Neumann 2004).

== Process ==
The market engineering approach is structured by means of a process as depicted in Market Engineering Process diagram. Taking into account the objectives of the new electronic markets, the requirements of the new electronic market are deduced in the first stage. Subsequently, the new market is designed with simultaneous consideration of the transaction object, the market microstructure, the IT infrastructure, and the business model. In the third stage, the mechanism is tested on its technical, economic and business properties. If needed, there is an iteration loop between designing and evaluating the market in order to make sure that the requirements are met. In the fourth stage, the thoroughly evaluated design is realized and implemented as a software system. Finally, the market platform is introduced. At any stage of the market engineering process, there is a decision whether to proceed with the next step or to repeat an earlier one.

=== Environmental analysis ===
The objective of the environmental analysis is to formalize the strategies and objectives of a new electronic market. The stage comprises two phases: the environment definition and the requirement analysis. The goal of the environment definition is to characterize the economic environment for which the market is to be engineered. This phase comprises the collection and analysis of potential trading objects, market segments, and agents that may interact on a particular segment. On the basis of this analysis, potential market segments for trading these resources are identified and evaluated comparatively. Having selected a target market, information about potential agents is determined. The target market reveals the economic environment for which the market is intended. The requirement analysis consists of a thorough extraction of these needs concerning the resource allocation problem and the environmental side constraints. On the basis of the requirement analysis, the market engineer decides whether to engineer a new mechanism from scratch or to reuse and adapt an existing one for the target problem. This decision is usually supported by a literature review, surveys, a SWOT analysis, and interviews with future market participants. The output of stage 1 is a list with all requirements.

=== Design ===
The second stage of the process comprises the design of the market with simultaneous consideration of the transaction object, the market microstructure, the IT infrastructure, and the business model. Supported by different tools and methodologies such as mechanism and parametric design the market mechanism is deduced as an allocation and payment function. For designing the IT infrastructure in order to e.g. ensure computational tractability we rely on methods from computer science. We provide different tools that assist the engineer in designing markets. For instance, the market engineer can rely on the generic market system meet2trade that supports different auction mechanisms and negotiation schemes (Weinhardt et al. 2006). The result of stage 2 is a conceptual model of the market system to be evaluated and implemented.

=== Evaluation ===
Having designed the market, it is tested upon its technical and economic properties. The evaluation stage comprises functionality tests of a software prototype to ensure its correctness, economic tests to measure the outcome performance of the market, and an assessment of the business model. Functionality tests are made to ensure that the prototype system works as it is designed. In other words, these tests ensure that the system correctly reflects the institutional rules. The objective of the economic tests is to ascertain whether or not the electronic market attains the desired economic outcome. This phase is supported by analytical and experimental evaluation methods. Experimental methods consist of laboratory experiments, numerical simulations, or agent-based simulations. Tools for this kind of evaluation are e.g. ZTree, Repast, MES and AMASE as part of the meet2trade system and the simulation tool jCASE . After functional and economic tests are performed, additional pilot runs with the software prototype are made. These runs provide information about the agents’ acceptance of the market and, if necessary, allow the engineer to adjust the underlying institutional rules or the prototype system.

=== Implementation ===
In this stage, the thoroughly evaluated design is realized and implemented as a software system. The market system can either be implemented from scratch or the prototype developed in the evaluation stage can be enhanced in an evolutionary process. This phase is supported by traditional software engineering concepts and tools, such as UML, design patterns, or the Rational Unified Process. The output of this phase is a fully implemented electronic market with the institutional rules and the business model.

=== Introduction ===
In the last stage of the process, the electronic market is introduced. The introduction of the electronic market initiates its operation cycle.

== Computer-aided market engineering ==
The Computer-Aided Market Engineering (CAME) tool suite meet2trade showcases a service engineering approach to the development of electronic markets as a service offering (Weinhardt et al. 2006, Neumann et al. 2005). For e-markets, the market operator—as service provider decides the following prerequisites that characterize the complex service: the products that will be traded; the market rules to match demand and supply; the IT infrastructure of the trading platform; the business structure defining the value proposition; and the business model to derive revenue from the service offering.

The CAME tool suite provides a conceptual framework for designing e-markets, a process model to guide the design, and methods and tools supporting these design steps. These tasks are inherently interdisciplinary. The strategic task of defining the segment, in which the e-market is intended to operate, is primarily a management and marketing endeavor. The design of the market mechanisms that describe the flow of the negotiation process, pertains to economics. Implementing the market mechanisms as a running service system is mainly a software engineering task.

The CAME approach extends state-of-the-art methods, as it tackles all problems associated with the design of e-markets holistically. For example, Knowledge-based Auction Design Support (KADS) enables the market operator to decide on the principal auction format. Auction Runtime Environment (ARTE) and Adaptive Client (AC) support the transformation of the concept into an instantiation of a running auction format, supporting embodiment and detail design. Lastly, Agent-based Simulation Environment (AMASE) and Experimental System (MES) provide extensive testing functionalities. Prototypes can be generated and tested on-the-fly, improving the design process considerably.

This research work focuses on how to design and operate market services, how to gain knowledge for this task, and how to provide this knowledge to those who need to set up auctions, exchanges, or e-procurement platforms. CAME epitomizes an SSME approach and meet2trade workbench showcases an integrated outcome of service sciences, management, and engineering.

== Literature ==
- Kolitz, K. and C. Weinhardt (2006). MES - Ein Experimentalsystem zur Untersuchung elektronischer Märkte. MKWI 2006, Passau, Germany.
- Neumann, D. (2004). Market Engineering - A Structured Design Process for Electronic Markets. Fakultät für Wirtschaftswissenschaften. Karlsruhe, Universität Karlsruhe (TH).
- Neumann, D., J. Maekioe, et al. (2005). CAME - A Toolset for Configuring Electronic Markets. ECIS, Regensburg.
- Roth, A. E. (2000). Game Theory as a Tool for Market Design. Game Practice: Contributions from Applied Game Theory. F. Patrone, I. Garcia-Jurado and S. Tijs. Dordrecht, Kluwer: 7-18.
- Roth, A. E. (2002). "The Economist as Engineer: Game Theory, Experimental Economics and Computation as Tools for Design Economics". Econometrica. 70 (4): 1341–1378. CiteSeerX 10.1.1.61.3706. doi:10.1111/1468-0262.00335.
- Smith, V. (2003). Markets, Institutions and Experiments. Encyclopedia of Cognitive Science. L. Nadel. London, Nature Publishing Group. 2: 991-998.
- Weinhardt, C.; Holtmann, C.; et al. (2003). "Market Engineering". Wirtschaftsinformatik. 45 (6): 635–640. doi:10.1007/bf03250926. S2CID 218840818.
- Weinhardt, C.; Neumann, D.; et al. (2006). "Computer-aided Market Engineering". Communications of the ACM. 49 (7): 79. doi:10.1145/1139922.1139953. S2CID 19352393.
- Wurman, Wellman and Walsh (1998). "The Michigan Internet AuctionBot: A Configurable Auction Server for Human and Software Agents" (Proceedings of the 2nd International Conference on Autonomous Agents)
