= Environmental engineering =

Engineering discipline related to environmental science

Environmental engineering is a professional engineering discipline related to environmental science. It encompasses broad scientific topics like chemistry, biology, ecology, geology, hydraulics, hydrology, microbiology, and mathematics to create solutions that will protect and also improve the health of living organisms and improve the quality of the environment. Environmental engineering is a sub-discipline of civil engineering and chemical engineering. In the realm of civil engineering, environmental engineering is focused mainly on sanitary engineering.

Environmental engineering applies scientific and engineering principles to improve and maintain the environment to protect human health, protect nature's beneficial ecosystems, and improve environmental-related enhancement of the quality of human life. Environmental engineers devise solutions for wastewater management, water and air pollution control, recycling, waste disposal, and public health. They design municipal water supply and industrial wastewater treatment systems, and design plans to prevent waterborne diseases and improve sanitation in urban, rural and recreational areas. They evaluate hazardous-waste management systems to evaluate the severity of such hazards, advise on treatment and containment, and develop regulations to prevent mishaps. They implement environmental engineering law, as in assessing the environmental impact of proposed construction projects.

Environmental engineers study the effect of technological advances on the environment, addressing local and worldwide environmental issues such as acid rain, global warming, ozone depletion, water pollution and air pollution from automobile exhausts and industrial sources.

Most jurisdictions impose licensing and registration requirements for qualified environmental engineers.

== Etymology ==
The word environmental has its root in the late 19th-century French word environ (verb), meaning to encircle or to encompass. The word environment was used by Carlyle in 1827 to refer to the aggregate of conditions in which a person or thing lives. The meaning shifted again in 1956 when it was used in the ecological sense, where Ecology is the branch of science dealing with the relationship of living things to their environment.

The second part of the phrase environmental engineer originates from Latin roots and was used in the 14th century French as engignour, meaning a constructor of military engines such as trebuchets, harquebuses, longbows, cannons, catapults, ballistas, stirrups, armour as well as other deadly or bellicose contraptions. The word engineer was not used to reference public works until the 16th century; and it likely entered the popular vernacular as meaning a contriver of public works during John Smeaton's time.

== History ==
=== Ancient civilizations ===
Environmental engineering is a name for work that has been done since early civilizations, as people learned to modify and control the environmental conditions to meet needs. As people recognized that their health was related to the quality of their environment, they built systems to improve it. The ancient Indus Valley Civilization (3300 B.C.E. to 1300 B.C.E.) had advanced control over their water resources. The public work structures found at various sites in the area include wells, public baths, water storage tanks, a drinking water system, and a city-wide sewage collection system. They also had an early canal irrigation system enabling large-scale agriculture.

From 4000 to 2000 B.C.E., many civilizations had drainage systems and some had sanitation facilities, including the Mesopotamian Empire, Mohenjo-Daro, Egypt, Crete, and the Orkney Islands in Scotland. The Greeks also had aqueducts and sewer systems that used rain and wastewater to irrigate and fertilize fields.

The first aqueduct in Rome was constructed in 312 B.C.E., and the Romans continued to construct aqueducts for irrigation and safe urban water supply during droughts. They also built an underground sewer system as early as the 7th century B.C.E. that fed into the Tiber River, draining marshes to create farmland as well as removing sewage from the city.

=== 19th century ===
Very little change was seen from the decline of the Roman Empire until the 19th century, where improvements saw increasing efforts focused on public health in densely populated urban centers. Modern environmental engineering began in London in the mid-19th century when Joseph Bazalgette designed the first major sewerage system following the Great Stink. The city's sewer system conveyed raw sewage to the River Thames, which also supplied the majority of the city's drinking water, leading to an outbreak of cholera. The introduction of drinking water treatment and sewage treatment in industrialized countries reduced waterborne diseases from leading causes of death to rarities.

=== 20th century ===
The field emerged as a separate academic discipline during the middle of the 20th century in response to widespread public concern about water and air pollution and other environmental degradation on a national-scale. As society and technology grew more complex, they increasingly produced unintended effects on the natural environment. One example is the widespread application of the pesticide DDT to control agricultural pests in the years following World War II. The story of DDT as vividly told in Rachel Carson's Silent Spring (1962) is considered to be the birth of the modern environmental movement, which led to the autonomous discipline of "environmental engineering."

=== 21st century ===
With the increased ability of the human population to impact the global environment, the discipline of environmental engineering recognized its role in solving the grand challenges of the 21st century. Five areas of opportunity, where environmental engineers are uniquely positioned to positively impact the global environment, include:

1. Sustainably supplying food, water, and energy
2. Curbing climate change and adapting
3. Designing a future without pollution or waste
4. Creating efficient, healthy, resilient cities
5. Fostering informed decisions and actions

A sixth grand challenge, educating the future workforce, was also identified in the report.

Building on this report, Daniel B. Oerther and colleagues defined Environmental Engineering 3.0 as simultaneously considering "the health, safety, and welfare of the public, as well as the health of the planet upon which all life depends." As an example of convergence research, modern environmental engineering is defined as using "engineering disciplines in developing solutions to problems of planetary health."

== Education ==
Many universities offer environmental engineering programs through departments of civil engineering, chemical engineering or dedicated environmental engineering departments. Environmental engineers in civil engineering programs often focus on hydrology, water resources management, bioremediation, and water and wastewater treatment plant design. Environmental engineers in chemical engineering programs tend to focus on environmental chemistry, advanced air and water treatment technologies, and separation processes. Environmental engineering curricula also include mathematics, biological sciences, fluid mechanics, environmental systems and engineering design. Related fields include natural resources engineering and agricultural engineering.

Courses for students fall into several broad areas:

- Mechanical engineering courses addressing mechanical systems used in environmental infrastructure, including water and wastewater treatment facilities, pumping stations and waste management equipment.
- Environmental engineering or environmental systems courses covering environmental infrastructure, water resources, pollution control and the design of systems that protect the environment.
- Environmental chemistry, sustainable chemistry or environmental chemical engineering courses addressing chemical processes, pollutants, contaminant transport and treatment technologies.
- Environmental technology courses involving instruments and systems used to monitor, measure, model and control environmental impacts, including technologies associated with renewable energy.

Environmental engineering programs also incorporate laboratory work, field studies and engineering design projects. At the University of Waterloo, the undergraduate curriculum includes environmental microbiology, hydrology, air quality engineering and contaminant transport. The environmental engineering program at Brown University combines natural sciences, engineering fundamentals and design projects.

=== Curriculum ===
The following topics make up a typical curriculum in environmental engineering:

1. Mass and Energy transfer
2. Environmental chemistry
  1. Inorganic chemistry
  2. Organic Chemistry
  3. Nuclear Chemistry
3. Growth models
  1. Resource consumption
  2. Population growth
  3. Economic growth
4. Risk assessment
  1. Hazard identification
  2. Dose-response Assessment
  3. Exposure assessment
  4. Risk characterization
  5. Comparative risk analysis
5. Water pollution
  1. Water resources and pollutants
  2. Oxygen demand
  3. Pollutant transport
  4. Water and waste water treatment
6. Air pollution
  1. Industry, transportation, commercial and residential emissions
  2. Criteria and toxic air pollutants
  3. Pollution modelling (e.g. Atmospheric dispersion modeling)
  4. Pollution control
  5. Air pollution and meteorology
7. Global change
  1. Greenhouse effect and global temperature
  2. Carbon, nitrogen, and oxygen cycle
  3. IPCC emissions scenarios
  4. Oceanic changes (ocean acidification, other effects of global warming on oceans) and changes in the stratosphere (see Physical impacts of climate change)
8. Solid waste management and resource recovery
  1. Life cycle assessment
  2. Source reduction
  3. Collection and transfer operations
  4. Recycling
  5. Waste-to-energy conversion
  6. Landfill

== Applications ==
=== Water supply and treatment ===
Environmental engineers evaluate the water balance within a watershed and determine the available water supply, the water needed for various needs in that watershed, the seasonal cycles of water movement through the watershed and they develop systems to store, treat, and convey water for various uses.

Water is treated to achieve water quality objectives for the end uses. In the case of a potable water supply, water is treated to minimize the risk of infectious disease transmission, the risk of non-infectious illness, and to create a palatable water flavor. Water distribution systems are designed and built to provide adequate water pressure and flow rates to meet various end-user needs such as domestic use, fire suppression, and irrigation.

=== Wastewater treatment ===
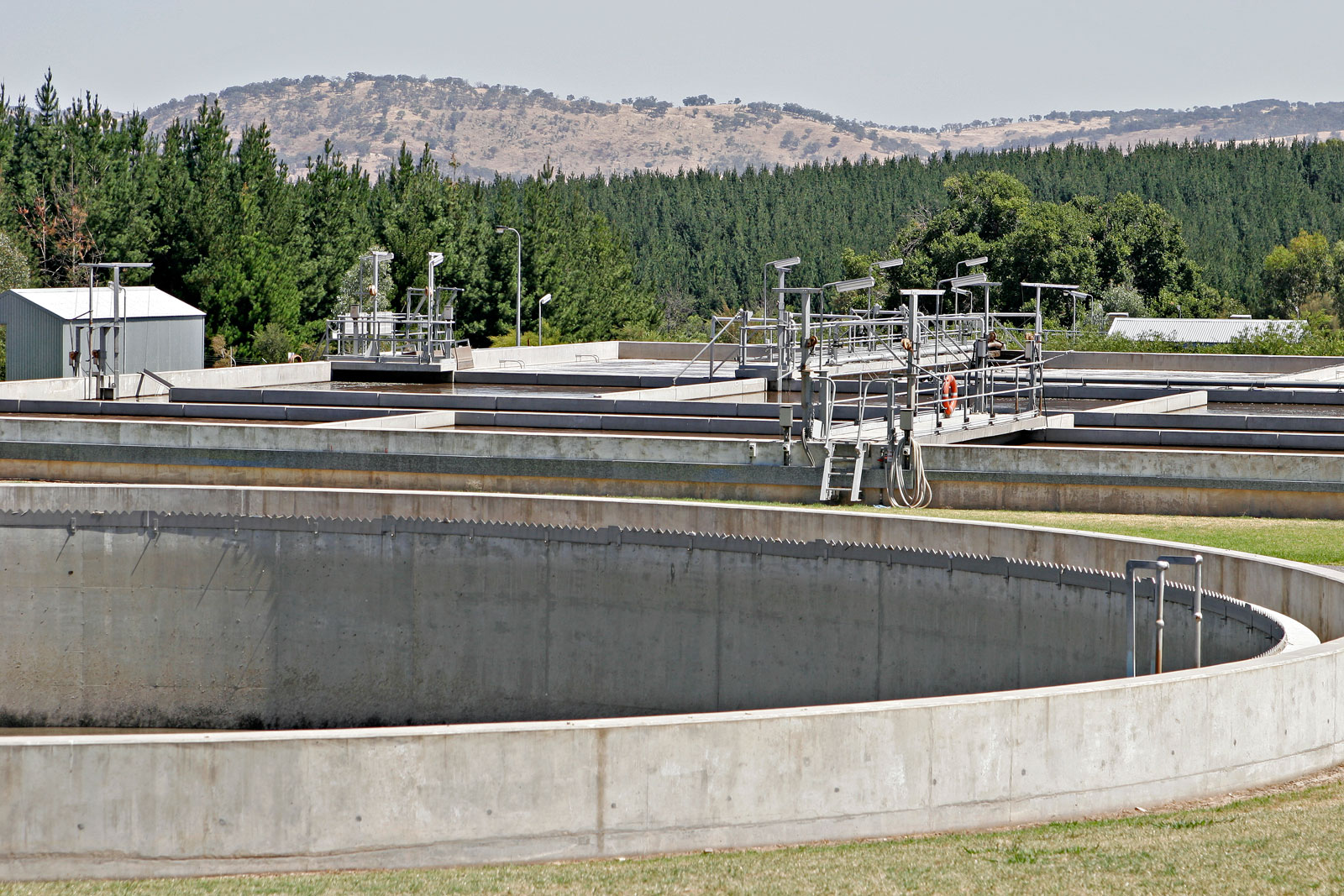
Sewage treatment plant, Australia

There are numerous wastewater treatment technologies. A wastewater treatment train can consist of a primary clarifier system to remove solid and floating materials, a secondary treatment system consisting of an aeration basin followed by flocculation and sedimentation or an activated sludge system and a secondary clarifier, a tertiary biological nitrogen removal system, and a final disinfection process. The aeration basin/activated sludge system removes organic material by growing bacteria (activated sludge). The secondary clarifier removes the activated sludge from the water. The tertiary system, although not always included due to costs, is becoming more prevalent to remove nitrogen and phosphorus and to disinfect the water before discharge to a surface water stream or ocean outfall.

=== Air pollution management ===
Scientists have developed air pollution dispersion models to evaluate the concentration of a pollutant at a receptor or the impact on overall air quality from vehicle exhausts and industrial flue gas stack emissions. To some extent, this field overlaps the desire to decrease carbon dioxide and other greenhouse gas emissions from combustion processes.

=== Environmental impact assessment and mitigation ===
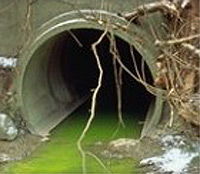
Water pollution

Environmental engineers apply scientific and engineering principles to evaluate if there are likely to be any adverse impacts to water quality, air quality, habitat quality, flora and fauna, agricultural capacity, traffic, ecology, and noise. If impacts are expected, they then develop mitigation measures to limit or prevent such impacts. An example of a mitigation measure would be the creation of wetlands in a nearby location to mitigate the filling in of wetlands necessary for a road development if it is not possible to reroute the road.

In the United States, the practice of environmental assessment was formally initiated on January 1, 1970, the effective date of the National Environmental Policy Act (NEPA). Since that time, more than 100 developing and developed nations either have planned specific analogous laws or have adopted procedure used elsewhere. NEPA is applicable to all federal agencies in the United States.

== Regulatory agencies ==
=== Environmental Protection Agency ===
The U.S. Environmental Protection Agency (EPA) is one of the many agencies that work with environmental engineers to solve critical issues. An essential component of EPA's mission is to protect and improve air, water, and overall environmental quality to avoid or mitigate the consequences of harmful effects.

== See also ==
- Atmospheric dispersion modeling
- Biofiltration
- Civil engineering
- Ecological sanitation
- Ecological engineering
- Engineering geology
- Environmental design
- Environmental engineering law
- Environmental engineering science
- Environmental health
- Environmental impact assessment
- Environmental management
- Environmental restoration
- Environmental science
- Environmental studies
- Geological Engineering
- Geoprofessions
- Hydraulic engineering
- Hydrology
- List of environmental degrees
- List of environmental engineers
- Sanitary engineering
- Water purification
- Water quality modeling

=== Associations ===
- American Academy of Environmental Engineers and Scientists
- Association of Environmental Engineering and Science Professors
- Association of Environmental Professionals
- Atmospheric dispersion modeling
- Confederation of European Environmental Engineering Societies
- Institute of Environmental Management and Assessment
- Society of Environmental Engineers
