= Engineering law =

Engineering law is the study of how engineering ethics and legal frameworks are adopted to ensure public safety surrounding the practice of engineering.

California law defines engineering as "the professional practice of rendering service or creative work requiring education, training and experience in engineering sciences and the application of special knowledge of the mathematical, physical and engineering sciences in such professional or creative work as consultation, investigation, evaluation, planning or design of public or private utilities, structures, machines, processes, circuits, buildings, equipment or projects, and supervision of construction for the purpose of securing compliance with specifications and design for any such work." By comparison, New York and Ontario law uses life and health in their definitions. Ontario defines engineering as the "planning, designing, composing, evaluating, advising, reporting, directing or supervising that requires the application of engineering principles and concerns the safeguarding of life, health, property, economic interests, the public welfare or the environment, or the managing of any such act."

California law makes public protection paramount. The legislative intent is that protection of the public shall be the highest priority of the Board for Professional Engineers in California.

Engineering is a controlled activity in North America. The practice of engineering is largely separated from that of a natural scientist or a technician by engineering law and education. A semiconductor physicist and an electrical engineer practicing at a large company are mainly differentiated by the laws under which they practice and the licenses they carry, affecting the work they take legal responsibility for. The law varies from state to state but an engineer is likely to have to take legal responsibility for an engineering work. The immunity afforded to an unlicensed person (e.g. engineer in training, natural scientist or technician) whose work is reviewed and approved by a licensed professional engineer is absolute. Engineers are held to a specific legal standard for ethics and performance (see below), while a natural scientist or technician is not. Governments and the public trust engineers because their qualifications and experience are regulated by an engineering board and they are subject to disciplinary measures for professional misconduct or negligence, such as fines or suspension of license.

== Professional competencies ==
In North America, four years of engineering education and four years of professional experience are common requirements before being licensed as an engineer.

16–40 hours of update training per year are also generally required for a licensed engineer to continue to practice, to ensure they stay current with hard skills such as relevant codes, standards and technology. Engineering communications, engineering management and other soft skills are also popular training for practicing engineers.

== Key topics ==
Key topic areas for engineering law are:

- Engineering ethics, professional misconduct, negligent practice, gross negligence and criminal negligence are often defined by case law and legislation.
- Safety legislation, standards, codes, and regulations, which includes train safety, plant safety, risk management, the electrical code and food safety.
- Tort law is integral to assigning blame and damages after engineering failures.
- Contract law is the promissory basis for the vast majority of engineering projects.
- Product liability law for manufactured products may be a combination of tort law and legislation depending on the jurisdiction.
- Intellectual property protection, which includes patents, copyrights, trade secrets and integrated circuit topographies.

== Specific engineering laws ==
In the United States of America and Canada engineering is governed by state or provincial legislation. In Qatar engineering is governed by national legislation.

- In New York, engineers are governed by Article 145 of the Education Law.
- Pennsylvania has the Engineer, Land Surveyor and Geologist Registration Law. Act of May 23, 1945 P.L. 913, No 367 Cl 63.
- Vermont Title 26 Professions and Occupations Chapter 20 Professional Engineering.
- New Hampshire Section 310-A.
- Massachusetts M.G.L. Chapter 112, Sections 81D to 81T, M.G.L. Chapter 112 Sections 61 to 65E and 250 CMR 5: Professional Practice.
- Michigan law regulating and licensing engineering is under Article 20 of Public Act 299 of 1980.
- Illinois Statutes lists Professions, Occupations, And Business Operations (225 ILCS 325/) Professional Engineering Practice Act of 1989.
- Maine General Provisions (32 M.R.S.A. §1251 et seq.); State Board of Licensure (32 M.R.S.A. §1301 et seq.); Licensure (32 M.R.S.A. §1351 et seq.)
- Wyoming Title 33 Professions and Occupations; Chapter 29 Surveyors and Engineers
- Florida Administrative Code Chapter 61G15 Board of Professional Engineers Organization; Florida Statutes Chapter 471 – Engineering; Chapter 455 – Professional Regulation
- Ontario passed the Professional Engineers Act, R.S.O. 1990, Chapter 28 and R.R.O. Regulation 941: General.
- Alberta Engineering and Geosciences Act; Revised Statutes of Alberta 2000 Chapter E-11.
- California Professional Engineers Act; Business and Professions Code; 6700 - 6799; Chapter 7.
- Arkansas lists the Engineer Law (A.C.A. § 17-30-101 et seq w/amendments from 2013 Legislative Session)
- New Brunswick Chapter 9; Engineering and Geoscience Professions Act; Assented to June 5, 2015
- Washington Chapter 18.43 RCW Engineers and Land Surveyors
- Alaska Statutes Title 8 Chapter 48. Architects, Engineers, Land Surveyors, and Landscape Architects
- 2010 Georgia Code Title 43 Professions and Businesses Chapter 15 Professional Engineers and Land Surveyors.
- The State of Texas Title 6 Subtitle A Chapter 1001 Engineering Practice Act and Rules Concerning The Practice of Engineering and Professional Licensure
- Saskatchewan Chapter E-9.3 of the Statutes of Saskatchewan, 1996 (effective March 7, 1997) as amended by the Statutes of Saskatchewan, 1997, c.S-6.01; 2000, c.43; 2009, c.T-23.01; 2010, c.B-12 and c.19 and 20; 2013, c.C-21.1; 2014, c.E-13.1; and 2018, c.42.The Engineering and Geoscience Professions Act
- Manitoba C.C.S.M. c. E120 The Engineering and Geoscientific Professions Act
- Idaho Engineers and Surveyors Idaho Code, Title 54, Chapter 12
- New Jersey State Board of Professional Engineers and Land Surveyors Law
- Wisconsin Statutes Chapter 443 Examining Board Of Architects, Landscape Architects, Professional Engineers, Designers, And Professional Land Surveyors
- Nova Scotia Engineering Profession Act Chapter 148 Of The Revised Statutes, 1989 amended 2006, c. 29; 2008, c. 15; 2009, c. 13; 2010, c. 15.
- Prince Edward Island E-08-1 Engineering Profession Act
- Maryland Title 14 Business Occupations and Professions Professional Engineers
- Connecticut Chapter 391 Section 20-299 to 20-310 Professional Engineers and Land Surveyors
- Delaware Tittle 24 Professions and Occupations Chapter 28. Professional Engineers
- Virginia Regulations Governing Architects, Professional Engineers, Land Surveyors, Certified Interior Designers and Landscape Architects, Statutes Title 54.1, Chapter 4 Excerpts from Title 13.1
- West Virginia Code Chapter 30 – Professions And Occupations Article 13 - Engineers
- North Carolina General Statutes Of North Carolina Chapter 89C. Engineering And Land Surveying
- South Carolina Chapter 22 Engineers and Surveyors; Chapter 49 Department of Labor, Licensing and Regulation South Carolina State Board of Registration for Professional Engineers and Land Surveyor
- Alabama Law Regulating Practice of Engineering and Land Surveying; Code of Alabama 1975, Title 34, Chapter 11
- Mississippi Code of 1972; Title 73 Professions and Vocations Chapter 13 Engineers and Land Surveyors
- British Columbia Engineers and Geoscientists Act [RSBC 1996] Chapter 116
- Quebec chapter I-9 Engineers Act
- Newfoundland Statutes of Newfoundland and Labrador 2008 Chapter E-12.1 An Act Respecting The Practice Of Engineering And Geoscience
- Louisiana Laws; Revised Statutes; Title 37; Chapter 8 – Professional Engineering and Professional Surveying
- State of Oklahoma Statutes Regulating Professional Engineering and Land Surveying; 475
- Qatar, Law No. 19 of 2005 Regulating the Practice of Engineering Professions
- Hong Kong Institution of Engineers Ordinance (Cap. 1105)

== Intent of engineering laws ==
It is illegal for a practicing engineer to jeopardize public safety in any way. This means that an engineer must hold herself or himself to the highest level of technical and moral conduct reasonable or suffer litigation if an engineering system fails causing harm to the public, including maintenance technicians. Breaches of engineering law are often sufficient grounds for enforcement measures, which may include the suspension or loss of license and financial penalties. They may also include imprisonment, should gross negligence be shown to have played a part in loss of human life.

An engineering license provides the public with the assurance that qualified persons are doing or overseeing engineering work. An unlicensed worker or manager has no specific liability, as this is borne by the employer through tort law or engineering legislation, and there is no regulatory authority to enforce that good engineering practice is applied in relation to the work.

In cases of gross negligence, an engineering firm may not be considered vicariously liable for an individual engineer's offence.

== Disciplinary committees ==
California law dictates disciplinary proceedings by the Board for Professional Engineers, Land Surveyors and Geologists against a licensed engineer who has committed deceit, misrepresentation, negligence or a violation of contract. The Professional Engineers of Ontario have a disciplinary committee that hears complaints of professional misconduct and incompetence. A discipline committee may suspend a certificate of authorization (firm license) for an engineering corporation, an engineering license or issue a fine for violations of the local engineering legislation for professional misconduct, deceit, misrepresentation, negligence or violation of contract.

Engineers may appeal the regulatory discipline committee's verdict in a divisional court depending on the jurisdiction.

== Taking responsibility for engineering work (supervision and oversight) ==
There is a supervisory exemption to engineering work in some states or provinces. Unlicensed employees may do engineering work if it is done under the supervision of a licensed engineer with an appropriate and documented supervisory model.

If an engineer is going to take legal responsibility for the work of an engineer in training, a technician or a natural scientist they must follow the work as it progresses (especially any problems that arise), thoroughly review the work and ensure that adequate consideration has been given to the work. Furthermore, the engineer must be fully aware of all the challenges in the engineering work, supervision or design. The engineer must be directly involved in all solutions to the challenges in the engineering work. The engineer carries the legal responsibility for the consequences of the mistakes in the engineering work they have taken legal responsibility for according to the local Professional Engineering Statute. In the United States of America the National Society of Professional Engineers calls this concept Responsible Charge.

Details are important when determining how much personal supervision and direction is enough when an engineer supervises a non-licensed individual. The engineer must be in control of the work. An engineering law textbook defines supervision as follows. "The engineer must give reasonable supervision to the work. He or she is not required to do everything in the way of watching the direction of works under his or her charge, but he or she is required to give such care and attention to the work while it is in progress as the nature and difficulties of the particular work reasonably demand."

Taking responsibility for engineering work applies to outsourcing where an engineer in North America may take responsibility for engineering work performed in India or China. Engineering legislation in North America is most often silent on geography. The licensed engineer must ensure proper standards of practice, that codes and standards have been followed and public safety for work they are responsible for. The immunity afforded to an employee at an outsourced operation whose work is reviewed and approved by a professional engineer is absolute in the jurisdiction where the work is reviewed and approved.

When providing licensed oversight over engineering work an engineer must provide a written plan of the supervisory or oversight relationship with non-licensed individuals. The decision-making process must be clearly laid out between the licensed engineer and the subordinate non-licensed person carrying out the work. This ensures accountability for engineering products and services especially when multiple jurisdictions are used to produce the engineered product or service.

== The seal or stamp ==
In many jurisdictions, engineering regulatory bodies require a seal or stamp for all engineering drawings, analysis and documentation related to any customer who relies on an engineer. The engineer sealing or stamping the work must be in control of it as an author or reviewer. The analysis or drawing must meet the standards of competent engineering and be able to be relied on as intended. The seal or stamp indicates that the engineer sealing the document or drawing is likely legally responsible for the mistakes in the document or drawing.

The seal or stamp contains the engineer's name, jurisdiction of practice and license number so that a customer can complain to an engineering board in cases of negligence or incompetence.

As far as tort law or criminal law goes, it does not matter whether the work was stamped.

It is generally agreed that an engineer's stamp or seal communicates to officials and to the public that the document's contents reflect professional knowledge and care; and that applicable statues, standards, codes and regulations have been followed. A customer who relies on an engineer's stamp is not likely to be liable for the work it covers.

A sealed or stamped engineering work is often considered the controlled copy of the work.

It does not matter whether or not the customer asked for the seal or stamp. The analysis or drawing must be sealed or stamped if it is a technical engineering work. Internal analysis or drawings within a corporation or a partnership need not be sealed or stamped, although they may be, at the engineer or organization's discretion. Non-engineering work such as financial analysis or contracts must not be stamped or sealed with an engineer's stamp even if they are performed by an engineer.

The consequence of failure to seal a document is for the engineer to be put in front of the regulatory discipline panel. Only a regulatory discipline panel can make a determination as to whether a document, analysis or drawing needed to be sealed.

== International engineering law ==
In an international engineering project there may be a country where the work is originated and a country where the work is executed. The laws of both the originating country and the project destination country must be observed. Further complications may occur when the country where the engineering work is reviewed and approved is not the country where the work is originated or executed (e.g. outsourcing at a large corporation). In this case, a high ethical standard must be observed where all relevant laws, codes and standards are applied.

Extreme caution must be applied in the outsourcing of engineering works as deaths have occurred due to carelessness.

In contract law, the contract law in the country where the contract was signed is generally observed.

The Washington Accord is an agreement that was put in place by a number of international signatories, recognizing their approaches and systems for accrediting university engineering programs as comparable. Signatories to the Washington Accord are Australia, Canada, China, Taiwan, Hong Kong China, India, Ireland, Japan, Korea, Malaysia, New Zealand, Pakistan, Russia, Singapore, South Africa, Sri Lanka, Turkey, the United Kingdom and the United States of America.

A Washington Accord degree does not confer a licence to practice engineering. Licences to practice engineering are granted by the government or independent bodies that are legislated to confer a licence.

In certain jurisdictions engineering laws are weak. The following countries have weak laws surrounding engineering:

- The United Kingdom where only specific safety related tasks require a registered engineer.
- France is not a member of the Washington Accord. The practice of engineering is neither controlled nor regulated by French law.
- In Germany the term 'engineer' is an academic title and there are no licences.
- India has construction laws but professional engineering is not legislated.

Weak engineering law can cause a variety of problems regarding public safety. The safety culture of an organization of practitioners is often dictated by ethics clauses in engineering law. If there is no engineering law or weak engineering law there is no control of safety culture afforded by the law and human factors safety culture of products and services may suffer leading to unsafe outcomes. The engineering profession was developed, in North America, to prevent certain problems and behaviours observed in the application of science and math in the public interest to safeguard life and public welfare. Laws to prevent executives, lawyers or managers at engineering firms from pushing engineers to make unsafe decisions for financial reasons or to meet a schedule can make countries safer places to live.

== Order in engineering ==
Engineering must be conducted in an orderly and ethical manner where all appropriate codes and standards are carefully considered. Orderly consideration is a vital part of any engineering work involving public safety or a contract. Any disorder involved in engineering practice could be termed as reckless or hacking and may endanger the public's trust in the safety or quality of the engineering being practiced. Negligent practice evolves when managerial, accounting, scheduling or legal pressure impinges on the careful consideration of proper engineering practice. Engineers must conduct themselves in a dignified manner and their work must reflect this dignity and a dedication to excellence.

To avoid wanton or reckless engineering practice engineers must ensure they have documented process, formalized requirements and formal methods of practice. All documents, drawings and analysis must be up to a high standard and must be well considered. Engineers must use the statutes listed in this article to push back against contract, managerial, financial or schedule pressures that may affect public safety related to any engineering work.

It is possible to compare the professions of law and engineering. Just as courts must maintain a certain order or decorum for a fair trial to proceed so too engineering must be conducted in an orderly fashion with a certain formalized method and process. When this order breaks down catastrophes may occur. Human factors safety culture is paramount.

Specifically, Ontario engineering law Regulation 941 demands fairness and loyalty to the practitioner’s associates, employer, clients, subordinates and employees; devotion to high ideals of personal honour and professional integrity; co-operation in working with other professionals engaged on a project; courtesy and good faith towards other practitioners; and no malicious attempts to injure the reputation or business of another practitioner.

== Satisfactory practice ==
While a practicing engineer may aim for high ideals and exemplary work practices, she or he encounters schedule and budget pressures in conventional practice. The question becomes how good is good enough for an engineering work? This question is answered differently for an engineering drawing or analysis and engineered product. Engineering drawings or analysis should generally be well considered with respect to the appropriate codes and standards and held to a mark of 'B' in a fourth year engineering school by a licensed and tenured engineering professor. The engineering drawings or analysis must not lead to any safety hazards by those relying on the work. Engineering product must be safe for the consumer or industry that is relying on the product. The quality of the engineered product must be sufficient to satisfy local product liability legislation and case law.

So how safe is safe enough? Local engineering statues must be satisfied. Certainly meeting the legislative intent of the local codes and standards is important but as low as reasonably practicable (ALARP) is often the easiest standard to apply when no clear code or standard fits. ALARP is the principle where the hazard rate is lowered as far as technology and cost will reasonably allow. ALARP originates in law in the United Kingdom.

== Product liability law ==
Product liability law affects engineers and inventors. Product liability law is based on tort law but does not require a contract or proven negligence. An engineer may be subject to disciplinary action from the local engineering board as well as litigation through tort law such as product liability law for dangerous flaws in engineered product.

== Patent law ==
A patent is a type of intellectual property that gives its owner the legal right to exclude others from making, using, or selling an invention for a limited period of time in exchange for publishing and enabling disclosure of the invention. In most countries, patent rights fall under private law and the patent holder must sue someone infringing the patent in order to enforce their rights. In some industries patents are an essential form of competitive advantage.

== Industrial exemption ==
Broadly speaking, an industrial exemption, in jurisdictions where it exists, allows engineers who are neither licensed nor supervised by a licensee to perform engineering work for their employer if such work is incidental to the production of their employer's products and if neither the corporation nor the engineers offer engineering services directly to the public.

== See also ==
- Remote laboratory – Arrangement for conducting experiments at one location while situated at another
- Engineering disasters – Causes and list of disasters
- Engineering management
- Environmental engineering law
- Entertainment law – Legal services provided to the entertainment industry
- Law – System of enforceable rules
