= Environmental engineering law =

Environmental engineering law is a profession that requires an expertise in both environmental engineering and law. This field includes professionals with both a legal and environmental engineering education. This dual educational requirement is typically satisfied through an ABET accredited degree in environmental engineering and an ABA accredited law degree. Likewise, this profession requires both licensure in professional environmental engineering and admittance to one bar.

Environmental engineering law is the professional application of law and engineering principles to improve the environment (air, water, and/or land resources), to provide healthy water, air, and land for human habitation and for other organisms, and to remediate polluted sites. Environmental engineering lawyers seek to promote the advancement of technical engineering knowledge in the legal profession and to enhance informed legal analysis of complex environmental matters.

== Practice areas ==
Environmental engineering law professionals offer a sound knowledge base in the fields of both environmental engineering and law to address complex environmental problems which demand both professional technical practice and legal expertise. Areas of practice are continually expanding, but frequently include complex land transactions, such as:

- Brownfields redevelopment
- Asbestos baseline survey and building revaluation due to forthcoming asbestos abatements
- Soil contamination assessment & remediation, the development of a remedial action workplan (RAWP) and engineering controls, including an environmental land use restriction (ELUR)
- Total maximum daily load (TMDL) nutrient loading studies (ex. for NPDES wastewater discharges) and regulatory negotiation of nutrients discharge limits from waste treatment plants, such as phosphorus and nitrogen.

== See also ==
- Engineering law
- Environmental law – Branch of law concerning the natural environment
- Environmental agreements
- Environmental Engineering Science – Field of engineering science
- Environmental impact statement – Assessment required under US environmental law
- Environmental justice – Social movement
- International environmental law – Branch of law concerning the natural environment
