= Tropical cyclone engineering =

Sub-discipline of civil engineering

Tropical cyclone engineering, or hurricane engineering, is a specialist sub-discipline of civil engineering that encompasses planning, analysis, design, response, and recovery of civil engineering systems and infrastructure for hurricane hazards. Hurricane engineering is a relatively new and emerging discipline within the field of civil engineering. It is an integration of many recognized branches of engineering, such as structural engineering, wind engineering, coastal engineering, and forensic engineering, with other recognized sciences and planning functions such as, climatology, oceanography, architecture, emergency management and preparedness, hazard mitigation, and hazard vulnerability analysis. Hurricane engineering aims to minimize risks to human safety, the natural and built environment, and business processes.

== United States ==
As a result of the tremendous threats to life safety and economic disruptions caused by the 2004 and 2005 hurricane seasons, governmental organizations, such as the United States National Science Foundation, have recognized the need to better understand hurricane threats and further establish this discipline. In September 2006, the National Science Board released recommendations to the United States Congress calling for major new investments in hurricane science and engineering.

Accredited university engineering programs, such as the Louisiana State University civil engineering department and University of Notre Dame Department of Civil Engineering and Geological Sciences, are establishing programs to better understand these catastrophic storms and their interaction with the environment. The LSU Hurricane Center has begun to offer hurricane engineering courses with the focus of educating students on the unique threats caused by hurricanes.

The past two decades have witnessed exponential growth in damage due to hurricanes and the situation continues to deteriorate. The most vulnerable areas, coastal counties along the Gulf and Atlantic seaboards, are experiencing greater population growth and development than anyplace else in the country. If the trend of rapidly increasing losses caused by hurricanes is to be reversed, a whole new philosophy of understanding, planning, and preparedness is required. The Hurricane Engineering curriculum is the result of a multidisciplinary project aimed at giving engineering students a comprehensive understanding of the hazards associated with hurricanes:

- Extreme winds
- Windborne debris
- Storm surges
- River flooding
- Rain-induced landslides

Some hurricane engineering proposals involve nuclear bombs. The NOAA and most weather scientists are opposed to the idea.

== Northwest Pacific ==
In the Northwest Pacific, where the term for strong tropical cyclones is typhoon, the concept of typhoon engineering, which is very similar to Hurricane Engineering, is being proposed.
