= Optomechatronics =

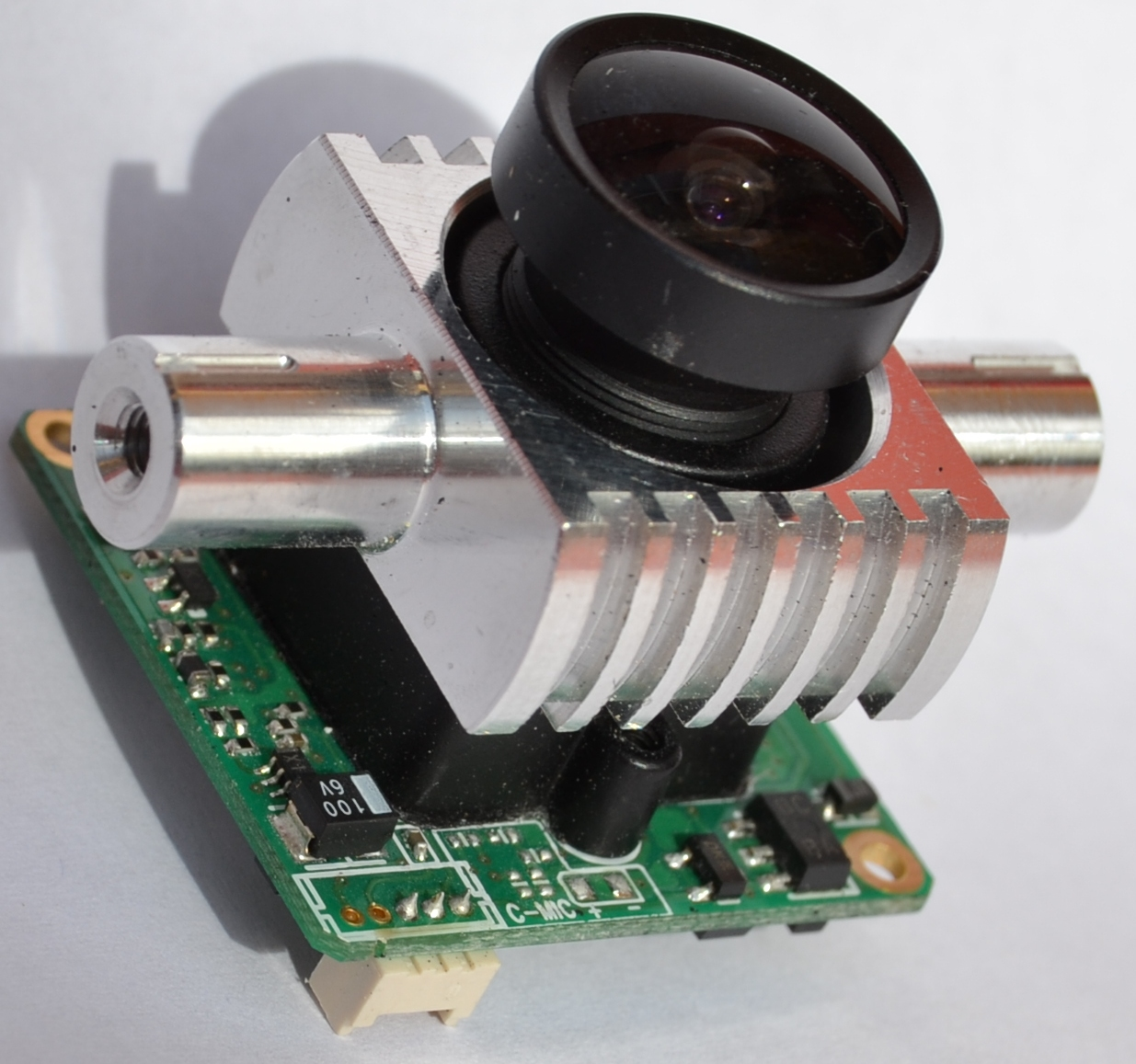
Optical sensor used for pattern and shape recognition

In engineering, optomechatronics is a field that investigates the integration of optical components and technology into mechatronic systems. The optical components in these systems are used as sensors to measure mechanical quantities such as surface structure and orientation. Optical sensors are used in a feedback loop as part of control systems for mechatronic devices. Optomechatronics has applications in areas such as adaptive optics, vehicular automation, optofluidics, optical tweezers and thin-film technology.
