= Component engineering =

Component engineering is an engineering discipline primarily used to ensure the suitability and testability of suitable components required to manufacture a larger product.

The term combines two ideas:

- A component—a smaller, self-contained part of a larger entity
- Engineering—the discipline and profession of applying science to implement some functional design

Component designer engineers design, oversee the production, and test components for machines used in many different industries, from aviation to manufacturing, IT, software, telecommunications, and many more. To make machine parts that are reliable and effective, they are involved in various stages of production, starting from research and product development, to compliance and design, or might work on testing and installing components.

== See also ==
- Engineering
- Just in time (business)
- List of engineering branches
- Manufacturing engineering
