= Natural resources engineering =

Natural Resources Engineering, the sixth Abet accredited environmental engineering program in the United States, is a subset of environmental engineering that applies various branches of science in order to create new technology that aims to protect, maintain, and establish sustainable natural resources. Specifically, natural resources engineers are concerned with applying engineering concepts and solutions to prevalent environmental issues. Common natural resources this discipline of engineering works closely with include both living resources such as plants and animals as well as non-living resources such as renewable energy, land, soils, and water. Natural resource engineering also involves researching and evaluating natural and societal forces. The hydrological cycle is the main component of natural forces and the desires of other people attribute to societal forces. Some historical examples of applications of natural resources engineering include the Roman aqueducts and the Hoover Dam.

Natural resource engineering degrees require a basic understanding of core engineering classes including calculus, physics, chemistry, and engineering mechanics, as well as additional courses with a stronger focus on applications of natural resources in environmental systems. These specific courses include soil and water engineering, modeling of biological and physical systems, properties of biological materials, and systems optimization.

The overall purpose of natural resource engineering is mainly categorized as either resource development, environmental management or both. Natural resource engineers often work in a vast variety of environments ranging from urban to rural. Most natural resource engineers can be found working for groups who strive to solve current and future environmental issues such as environmental consulting firms and government agencies.

== History ==
Natural resources engineering has always existed as an extension of biological engineering, but demand for such practices continue to increase along with increasing urbanization. The development of basic farming techniques, irrigation, and basic wells were a significant step in natural resources engineering for the Human race. Important historical examples of natural resources engineering include the Roman aqueducts and the Hoover Dam. Natural resource engineering is of vital importance in developing regions to address issues such as access to clean drinking water as well as sanitation and sustainable food production. In 1981 Environmental Resource Engineering became the 6th Abet Accredited environmental engineering program in the U.S. Natural resources engineering will be an important factor in how the natural environment will respond to rising pressure on environmental and agricultural resources.

== Concepts and areas of research and development ==
The discipline of Natural Resource engineering specifically concentrates on natural resources. Natural resources are "industrial materials and capacities (such as mineral deposits and water power) supplied by nature" and sometimes legally are classified by their ability to be used by humans to meet their demands. Natural resources can be both living and non-living natural elements and include fossil fuels, plants, animals, minerals, sediment, and bodies of water. Areas of research and development in natural resources engineering concerning the hydro-logical cycle include: erosion control, flood control, water quality renovation and management, irrigation, drainage, bio-remediation, air quality, watershed-stream assessment, and ecological engineering.

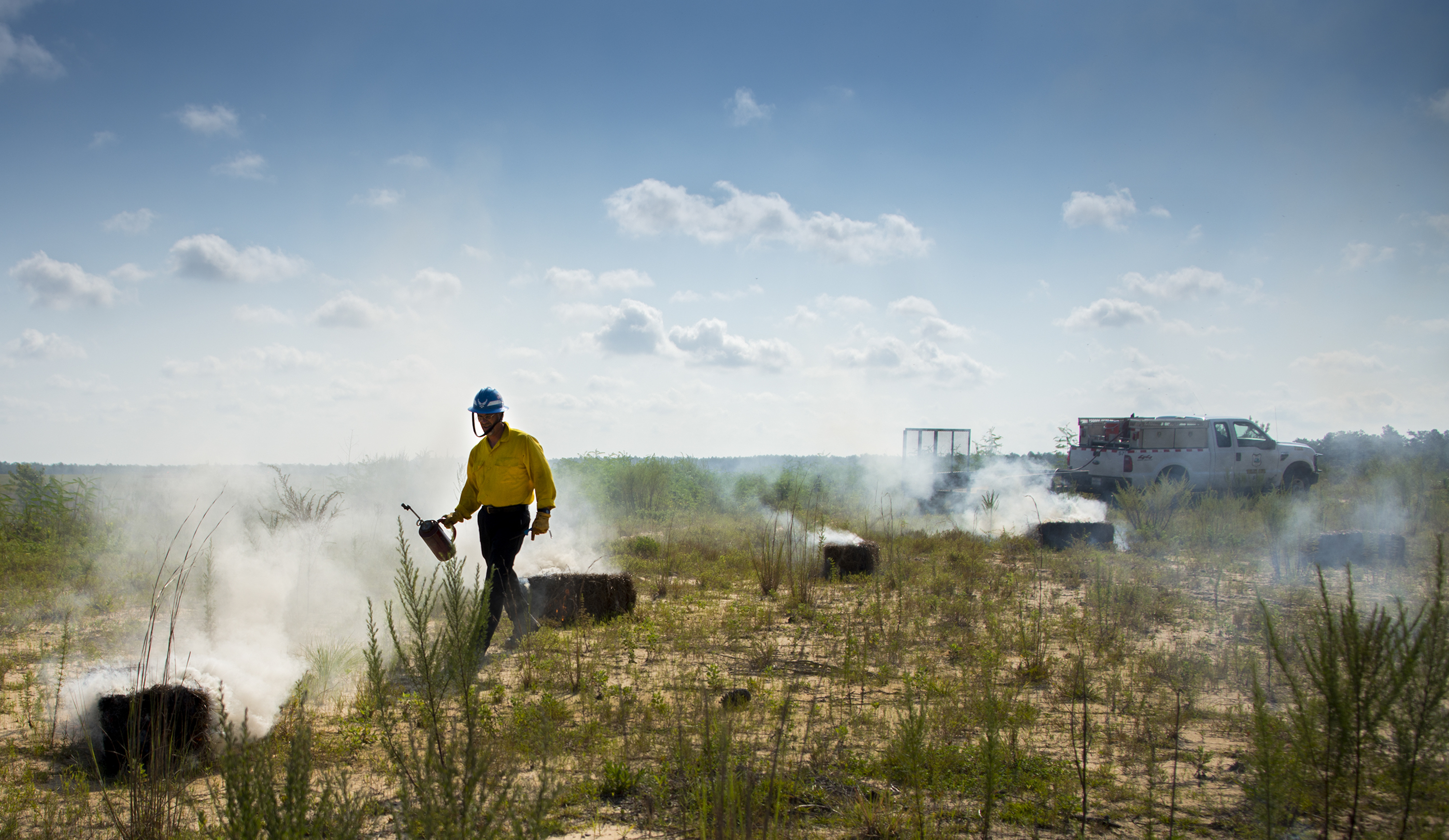
Members of Jackson Guard’s wildland fire center are responsible for controlling and maintaining Eglin’s natural resources and operations areas through controlled burning of its forest

This discipline of engineering also involves investigating different natural and societal forces on the environment. The main natural force researched by natural resources engineers is the hydro-logical cycle. This cycle is concerned with how water transitions through the environment through the processes of evaporation, condensation, precipitation, and transpiration. This cycle is a concern when looking at prevalent environmental issues on the earth, and therefore is a major concern for natural resource engineers. The main societal force that concerns natural resource engineers is the exploitation of natural resources by humans. This force concerns natural resource engineers because it threatens to deplete or harm many sources of natural resources.

With this concentration on natural resources and natural and societal impact, natural resource engineers are constantly searching for ways to apply engineering concepts to create developments that aim to protect, maintain, and establish sustainable sources of natural resources. Some current areas of research and developments include: finding ways to maximize the utilization of natural resources in fuel with minimum waste, developing infrastructure and equipment with the intent to provide protection for the overall environment and sources of natural resources, finding solutions to current environmental issues that directly impacted sources of natural resources such as soil erosion, sediment loss, flooding, and pollution, seeking efficient ways to manage natural resources so they will not be depleted, and finding ways to conserve and allocate resources efficiently as the population increases dramatically.

== Courses ==
To obtain a degree in natural resource engineering, a solid engineering background is required, as well as specific technical knowledge specific to natural resources and their role in our environment. Most degree programs within this specific discipline are partnered within larger disciplines of engineering such as environmental engineering, biological engineering, or agricultural engineering.

=== Standard engineering courses ===
- Mathematics (Calculus, differential equations, statistics)
- Physics
- Chemistry
- Engineering Mechanics (Statics, Dynamics, Solids Mechanics)
- Fluid Mechanics
- Thermodynamics

=== Natural resources engineering specific course topics ===
- Materials, instrumentation, and measurement classes specific to biological systems
- Systems optimization
- Modeling and management of biological and physical systems
- Soil, water, conservation, and nutrient management engineering

== Careers ==
With a degree in natural resources engineering, there are various different industries that one could pursue a career in. Some of these industries include federal, state, and local government agencies(such as the Natural Resource Conservation Service), environmental consulting firms, agricultural and food processing industries, and various other industries and companies that focus on solving environmental issues. In the government sector, natural resource engineers usually find themselves working on projects that work to manage government owned and operated natural resources and help solve environmental issues that impact these resources. Within an environmental consulting firm, a natural resource engineer may find themselves running calculations and making predictions about different ways to utilize natural resources to maximize their efficiency. Within different processing industries, natural resource engineers may find themselves working on waste management efficiency and natural resource processing design.

Currently, the demand for natural resources engineers is greater than the supply of graduates and ranges locally to globally.

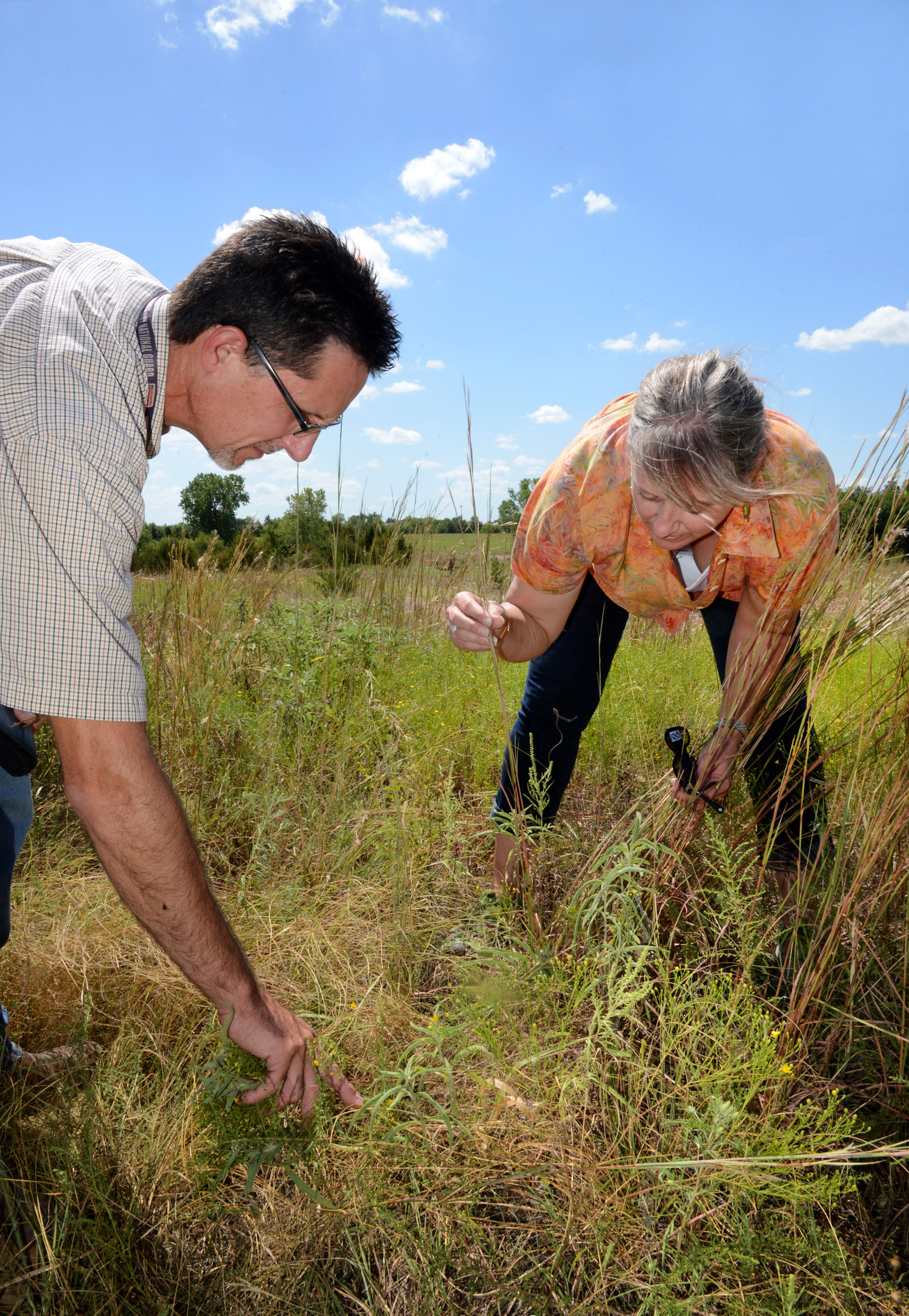
John Krupovage, Natural Resources manager with the 72nd Civil Engineering Directorate, and Dr. Karen Hickman, professor of Natural Resource Ecology and Management at Oklahoma State University and president of the Oklahoma Invasive Plant Council, find invasive blue stem prairie grasses around the Scissortail Trail area of Tinker Air Force Base. Dr. Hickman and her team are helping the Tinker Environmental Management Directorate on a DOD-funded five-year project to kill invasive (non-native) grasses and to restore native prairie grasses to the urban greenway. (Air Force photo by Kelly White)

=== Specific careers in natural resources engineering ===
- Biomass Engineer
- Environmental Scientist
- Hydrology Engineer
- Marine Scientist
- Soil Scientist
- Ag-Aqua Engineer
- Agricultural Engineer
- Chemist
- Biochemist
- Genetic Engineer
