= Broadcast engineering =

Field of engineering dealing with radio and television broadcasting

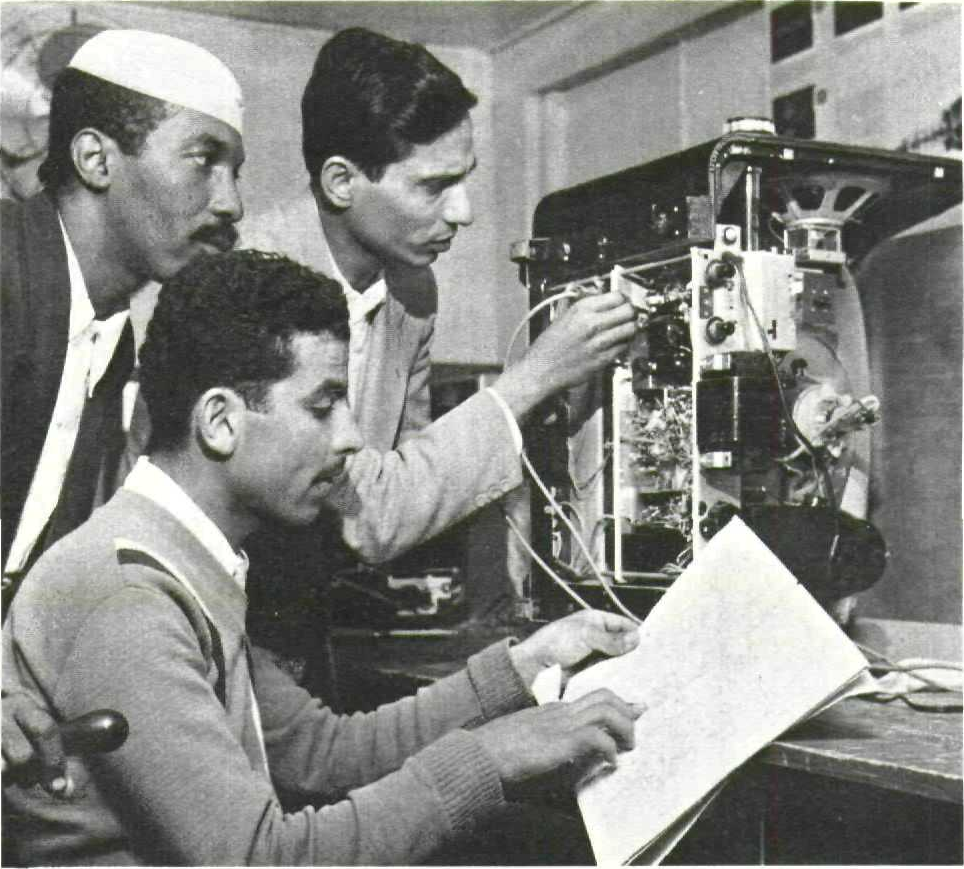

Occupation
- Names: Broadcast engineer Broadcast design engineer Broadcast systems engineer Broadcast IT engineer Broadcast IT systems engineer Broadcast network engineer Broadcast maintenance engineer Video broadcast engineer TV studio broadcast engineer Outside broadcast engineer Remote broadcast engineer
- Occupation type: profession

Description
- Competencies: Technical knowledge, Management skills, Professionalism
- Education required: see professional requirements
- Fields of employment: Radio, television, military
- Related jobs: Technologist, RF engineer, engineering technician, Technical operator

Broadcast engineering or radio engineering is the field of electrical engineering, and now to some extent computer engineering and information technology, which deals with radio and television broadcasting. Audio engineering and RF engineering are also essential parts of broadcast engineering, being their own subsets of electrical engineering.

Broadcast engineering involves both the studio and transmitter aspects (the entire airchain), as well as remote broadcasts. Every station has a broadcast engineer, though one may now serve an entire station group in a city. In small media markets the engineer may work on a contract basis for one or more stations as needed.

== Duties ==
Modern duties of a broadcast engineer include maintaining broadcast automation systems for the studio and automatic transmission systems for the transmitter plant. There are also important duties regarding radio towers, which must be maintained with proper lighting and painting. Occasionally a station's engineer must deal with complaints of RF interference, particularly after a station has made changes to its transmission facilities.

== Titles ==
Broadcast engineers may have varying titles depending on their level of expertise and field specialty. Some widely used titles include:

- Broadcast design engineer
- Broadcast Integration Engineer
- Broadcast systems engineer
- Broadcast IT engineer
- Broadcast IT systems engineer
- Broadcast network engineer
- Broadcast maintenance engineer
- Broadcast technician
- Video broadcast engineer
- TV studio broadcast engineer
- Outside broadcast engineer
- Remote broadcast engineer

== Qualifications ==
Broadcast engineers may need to possess some or all of the following degrees, depending on the broadcast technical environment. If one of the formal qualifications is not present, a related degree or equivalent professional experience is desirable.

- Degree in electrical engineering
- Degree in electronic engineering
- Degree in telecommunications engineering
- Degree in computer engineering
- Degree in management information system
- Degree in broadcast technology

=== Knowledge ===
Broadcast engineers are generally required to know the following areas, from conventional video broadcast systems to modern Information Technology:

- Conventional broadcast
  - Audio/Video instrumentation measurement
  - Baseband video – standard / high-definition
  - Broadcast studio acoustics
  - Television studios - broadcast video cameras and camera lenses
  - Production switcher (Video mixer)
  - Audio mixer
  - Recording engineer
- Broadcast IT
  - Video compression - DV25, MPEG, DVB or ATSC (or ISDB)
  - Digital server playout technologies. - VDCP, Louth, Harris, control protocols
  - Broadcast automation
  - Disk storage – RAID / NAS / SAN technologies.
  - Archives – Tape archives or grid storage technologies.
  - Computer networking
  - Operating systems – Microsoft Windows / macOS / Linux / RTOS
  - Post production – video capture and non-linear editing systems (NLEs).
- RF
  - RF satellite uplinking – High-powered amplifiers (HPA)
  - RF communications satellite downlinking – Band detection, carrier detection and IRD tuning, etc.
  - RF transmitter maintenance - IOT UHF transmitters, solid-state VHF transmitters, solid-state MF transmitters (AM radio), tube type VHF, and MF transmitters. Antennas, transmission lines, high power filters, digital modulators, towers, tower lighting systems, and backup generators.
- Health and safety
  - Occupational safety and health
  - Fire suppression systems like FM 200.
  - Basic structural engineering
  - RF hazard mitigation

Above mentioned requirements vary from station to station.

== Digital engineering ==
The conversion to digital broadcasting means broadcast engineers must now be well-versed in digital television and digital radio, in addition to analogue principles. New equipment from the transmitter to the radio antenna to the receiver may be encountered by engineers new to the field. Furthermore, modern techniques place a greater demand on an engineer's expertise, such as sharing broadcast towers or radio antennas among different stations (diplexing).

Digital audio and digital video have vastly changed broadcast engineering. Broadcast studios and control rooms are now mostly digital, using non-linear editing and digital signal processing reducing costs in both time and money. Mixing consoles for both audio and video are continuing to become more digital in the 2000s, as is the computer storage used to keep digital media libraries. Effects processing and TV graphics are also able to be completed much more easily.

With the broadcast industry's shift to IP-based production and content delivery technology not only the production technology and workflows are changing, but also the requirements for broadcast engineers, which now include IT and IP-networking know-how.

Other devices used in broadcast engineering are telephone hybrids, broadcast delays, and dead air alarms. See the Glossary of electrical and electronics engineering for further explanations.

== Organizations ==
=== Brazil ===
- SET – Sociedade Brasileira de Engenharia de Televisão e Telecomunicações, Brazilian Society of Television and Telecommunications Engineering, Rio de Janeiro, Brazil.

=== Canada ===
- Central Canada Broadcast Engineers (CCBE), Paris, Ontario, Canada
- Western Association of Broadcast Engineers (WABE), Calgary, Alberta, Canada
- IEEE Broadcast Technology Society (BTS) – Ottawa Section, Canada

=== Germany ===
- FKTG – Fernseh- und Kinotechnische Gesellschaft e.V., Germany

=== Belgium ===
Studiotech, audiovisual engineering company specialized on broadcast equipements, Brussels.

=== India ===
- Broadcast Engineering Society – BES (India), New Delhi, India

=== Iran ===
- Iran Broadcasting University Iran, Tehran (plus two campuses in Qom and Dubai)

=== Japan ===
- Institute of Electrical and Electronics Engineers - Japan Council

=== Mexico ===
- Asociación Mexicana de Ingenieros y Técnicos en Radiodifusión A.C. (AMITRA), Delegación Benito Juárez, Mexico

=== China ===
- China Society of Motion Picture and Television Engineers, China
- IEEE Broadcast Technology Society (BTS) – Beijing Section, China
- IEEE Broadcast Technology Society (BTS) – Shanghai Section, China

=== China – Hong Kong ===
- Society of Motion Picture and Television Engineers-(Hong Kong) Section, 電影電視工程師協會香港分會 Hong Kong
- Society of Broadcast Engineers Hong Kong Chapter, 廣播工程師協會香港分會 Hong Kong
- Hong Kong Televisioners Association (HKTVA), 香港電視專業人員協會 Hong Kong

=== Philippines ===
- Society of Broadcast Engineers and Technicians of the Philippines, Inc. (SBETP), Quezon City, Philippines

=== Republic of China – Taiwan ===
- IEEE Broadcast Technology Society (BTS) – Taipei Section

=== South Africa ===
- The South African Broadcasting Corporation (SABC), Auckland Park, Johannesburg, South Africa,

=== South Korea ===
- Korean Broadcast Engineers & Technicians Association (KOBETA), Seoul, South Korea (ROK)

=== Turkey ===
- Chamber of Electrical Engineers (EMO) (Joint chamber of electrical, electronics and biomedical engineers)

=== United States ===
In the United States, many broadcast engineers belong to the Society of Broadcast Engineers (SBE). Some may also belong to the Society of Motion Picture and Television Engineers (SMPTE), or to organizations of related fields, such as the Audio Engineering Society or Institute of Electrical and Electronics Engineers (IEEE) - IEEE Broadcast Technology Society (BTS).

For public radio, the Association of Public Radio Engineers was created in late May 2006.

=== Uruguay ===
- ANDEBU – Asociación Nacional de Broadcasters Uruguayos, Montevideo, Uruguay

== Notable publications ==
- Radio (formerly BE Radio)
- Radio World
- TV Technology

== See also ==
- Engineering technician
- Technical operator
