= NewBay Media =

American magazine publisher (2006–2018)

- Founded: 2006
- Defunct: 2018
- Successor: Future plc
- Country of origin: United States
- Headquarters location: New York City
- Publication types: magazines
- Nonfiction topics: Music, Pro Audio/AV, Video & Broadcast, Consumer Electronics, and Education
- Official website: nbmedia.com (defunct)

NewBay Media, LLC was a magazine and website publisher founded in 2006 and headquartered in New York City.

NewBay Media served five marketplaces — Music, Pro Audio/AV, Video & Broadcast, Consumer Electronics, and Education.

In April 2018, Future plc acquired NewBay for $13.8 million.

== Acquisitions ==
In September 2006, NewBay Media (as an affiliate of The Wicks Group of Companies) acquired CMP Entertainment Media (Including Music Player Network, formerly Miller Freeman Music) from United Business Media which yielded Guitar Player, Bass Player, Keyboard, Pro Sound News, Systems Contractor News, Residential Systems, Videography, Government Video, DV, Technology & Learning, and Television Broadcast.

In 2007, NewBay Media acquired IMAS Publishing which yielded TV Technology, Radio World, Pro Audio Review, Audio Media, and some regional editions.

In 2009, Reed Business Information sold TWICE, Broadcasting & Cable, and Multichannel News to NewBay Media.

In early 2011, NewBay Media announced that it had acquired Mix, Electronic Musician, Radio, and Sound & Video Contractor magazines from Penton Media.

In 2012, NewBay Media bought the Music division of Future US.

In late 2012, NewBay Media acquired U.K.-based Intent Media (which was originally formed from the purchase of IP from United Business Media), including brands such as Music Week, PSNEurope, TVBEurope, MCV, Installation, and ToyNews. NewBay Media wanted to acquire these brands because of their strong market positioning and their historical links to the United Business Media purchases, as Pro Sound News was, prior to the spin off from UBM, sister magazine to PSNEurope (or Pro Sound News Europe).

In 2017, NewBay Media sold Revolver to Project Group M LLC.

In 2018, Future reacquired majority of the assets previously sold to NewBay Media by buying NewBay Media outright for US13.8 million.

== Publications ==
- Audio Media International
- Audio Pro
- AV Technology
- AV-iQ
- Bass Player
- Bike Biz
- Broadcasting & Cable
- Develop
- Digital Signage
- Digital Video
- Electronic Musician
- Government Video
- Guitar Aficionado
- Guitar Player
- Guitar World
- Installation
- Keyboard Magazine
- Licensing.biz
- MCV
- MI World
- Mix
- Mobile Entertainment
- Multichannel News
- Music Week
- Pro Audio Review
- ProSoundNews
- PSNEurope
- Residential Systems
- Radio
- Radio World
- Rental & Staging
- School CIO
- Sound & Video Contractor
- Systems Contractor News
- Tech & Learning
- Toy News
- TVBEurope
- TV Technology
- Twice
- Videography
