= Mix (magazine) =

Professional audio trade periodical

- Cover of the October 2024 issue, featuring Rick Rubin and Beabadoobee
- Editorial Director: Tom Kenny
- Categories: Music trade magazine
- Frequency: Monthly
- Founded: 1977
- Company: Future US
- Country: United States
- Based in: New York City
- Language: English
- Website: mixonline.com
- ISSN: 0164-9957

Mix magazine is a periodical, billing itself as "the world's leading magazine for the professional recording and sound production technology industry". The magazine is headquartered in New York City and distributed in 94 countries.

"It was co-founded in 1977 under the title of "the Mix" in San Francisco, originally as a tabloid style directory of recording services, by David Schwartz, Penny Riker-Jacob and Bill Laski with Hillel Resner as the first ad sales representative, and later publisher, and producer of the TEC Awards. The magazine became "MiX" without "the" ahead of it in April of 1980. It then skipped a month and then returned as a slick color magazine."

== History ==
In January 1989, Mix Publications, which included Mix magazine and Electronic Musician, was sold to Act II Publishing, a company owned by Norman Lear.

In the 1990s, Mix magazine, had offices in the former Jelly Belly building on Hollis Street in Emeryville, California.

In 1994, Mix Publications, was sold to Cardinal Business Media, in Philadelphia.

In 2007, its Korean version, Mix Korea, was started.

In 2011, NewBay Media bought it from Penton Media. In 2018, Future acquired NewBay Media. In 2021, the music production magazine Pro Sound News merged with Mix online.

== See also ==
- Interview with founder, David Schwartz NAMM Oral History Library, January 14, 2011
- The Evolution of Mix Magazine with Tom Kenny Pt. 1 : Focusrite Pro Podcast
- The Evolution of Mix Magazine with Tom Kenny Pt. 2 : Focusrite Pro Podcast
- The Evolution of Mix Magazine with Tom Kenny Pt. 3 : Focusrite Pro Podcast
- 20th anniversary issue of Mix
