= Game Players =

American video-game magazine

- Categories: Video game journalism
- Frequency: Monthly
- Publisher: Signal Research (1989–1992); GP Publications (1992–1994); Imagine Media (1994–1998)
- Founder: Robert C. Lock
- Founded: May 30, 1989; 36 years ago
- Final issue: June 1998
- Country: USA
- Based in: Greensboro, North Carolina, U.S. (later Burlingame, California, U.S.)
- Language: English
- ISSN: 1087-2779
- OCLC: 34042091

Game Players was a monthly video game magazine founded by Robert C. Lock in 1989 and originally published by Signal Research in Greensboro, North Carolina.

The original publication began as Game Players Strategy to Nintendo Games (the cover featured a disclaimer that claimed it had no affiliation with Nintendo, which already had its official publication in Nintendo Power). The magazine evolved over the years, spinning off a separate publication called Game Players Sega Genesis Guide when Sega entered the console market. These two magazines were later folded together into one magazine.

In 1996, the magazine changed its name to Ultra Game Players and introduced a radically different format. At the end of its run, it turned into Game Buyer, before being cancelled in 1998.

== History ==
Around 1992, Signal Research was shut down by investors that seized the company because of fiscal mismanagement. The publishing house was revived by an investment group as GP Publications, with the intention of being sold. About a year later, GP Publications was purchased by Future Publishing UK (mainly for Game Players) as an entry into the North American media publishing field. The newly acquired publication (along with PC Gamer, that was also published by GP Publications) was then used as a foundation to start a for a new American publishing company operated under the name of Imagine Media.

Games Players is the first video game magazine to feature a computer generated or CG cover. The magazine also featured mini-strategy guides, paper toys, trading cards and other branded items and extras, like posters for games, that were included when the issue was polybagged.

During 1989 and 1990, the company also put out a total of 16 "GameTapes", which were VHS tapes that showed how to beat certain NES games.

Humor is included in almost every videogame review and image caption. Readers' letters come at the beginning of the magazine and are often one of the highlights of the magazine. The magazine often includes a "newsletter" with irreverent jokes about magazine staffers, as well as cartoons. The introduction of Ultra Game Players was intended to coincide with the release of the Nintendo 64 and Super Mario 64, as originally, the Nintendo 64 went by the name Nintendo Ultra 64.

Ultra Game Players features an updated design which places the readers' letters at the end of the magazine. One of the features of Ultra Game Players is a "prize store" in which readers answered trivia questions for chances to win prizes. However, many readers complained that the humor that had made Game Players such an enjoyable magazine was missing from the Ultra version, which prompted a return to form soon after the switch.

Ultra Game Players continued until June 1998, at which point it was replaced by Game Buyer. Game Buyer ran for four more months before being cancelled by Imagine Publishing.

== Former employees ==
- Associate Publisher & Creative Director Vince Matthews went on to lead Future's Special Projects group (creating Pocket Gamer). After leaving Future, Vince became the Director of Marketing for Conspiracy Entertainment and later, went to work for The Walt Disney Company.
- Former magazine Editor in Chief Chris Slate helped launch PSM, became Editor in Chief at Nintendo Power, Editor in Chief of MacLife, and is currently now corporate communications manager at Nintendo.
- Managing Editor Bill Donohue went on to PSM.
- Francesca Reyes became Editor in Chief at Official Xbox Magazine, another Future publication.
- Frank O'Connor, who helmed the later issues of UGP and Game Buyer is now at Microsoft, became director of the Halo franchise.
- Roger Burchill became Managing Editor at PSM.
- Vince DiMiceli became the editor of The Brooklyn Paper.
- Chris Charla also went to Microsoft and now heads the Xbox One's Independent Developers division.
- Mike Salmon became Editor in Chief of PC Accelerator magazine and later Official Xbox Magazine, and is currently Director of Research and Planning for 2K Games.
