= Eurogamer =

Video games news and reviews website

- Company type: Subsidiary
- Website type: Video game journalism
- Headquarters: United Kingdom
- Founders: John Bye; Patrick Stokes; Rupert Loman
- Editor: Chris Tapsell
- Industry: Digital media
- Parent: Gamer Network
- Website: www.eurogamer.net
- Commercial: Yes
- Registration: Optional
- Launched: 4 September 1999; 27 years ago

Eurogamer is a British video game journalism website launched in 1999. It founded parent company Gamer Network.

In 2008, it started in the formerly eponymous trade fair EGX (Eurogamer Expo until 2013) organised by its parent company. From 2013 to 2020, sister site USGamer ran independently under its parent company.

== History ==
Eurogamer (initially stylised as EuroGamer) was launched on 4 September 1999 under company Eurogamer Network. The founding team included John Bye, the webmaster for the PlanetQuake website and a writer for British magazine PC Gaming World; Patrick Stokes, a contributor for the website Warzone; and Rupert Loman, who had organised the EuroQuake esports event for the game Quake. It became the official online media partner of the 2002 European Computer Trade Show. By the end of 2012, visits to the Eurogamer website and its ten European foreign-language versions had increased by over ten percent compared to the previous year.

In February 2015, Eurogamer abandoned its ten-point scale for review scores in favor of highlighting games the reviewer felt particularly strongly about with labels such as "Essential", "Recommended" or "Avoid". The change was driven by doubt about the score system's usefulness and its desire to be delisted from review aggregator Metacritic because of its "unhealthy influence" on the games industry. In May 2023, Eurogamer returned to scoring reviews, opting for a five-point scale due to them being "universally understood, simple to take in at a glance, and easily shared."

In February 2018, Eurogamer's parent company, Gamer Network, was acquired by Reed Exhibitions, a division of RELX. In September 2021, the community forum for Eurogamer closed, with the site recommending other platforms such as Discord instead.

In May 2024, Gamer Network was sold to IGN Entertainment, a subsidiary of Ziff Davis.

=== Editors ===
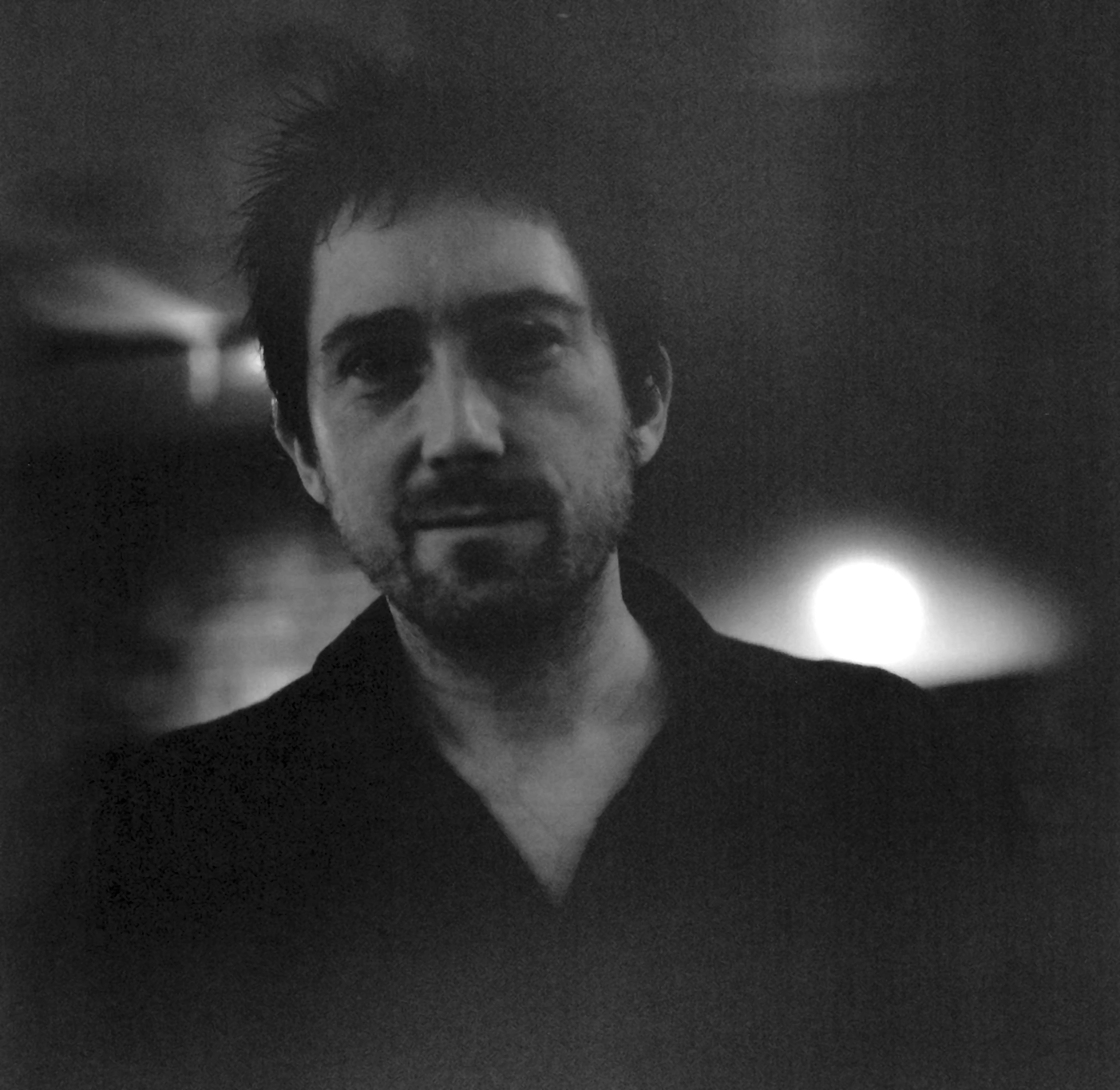
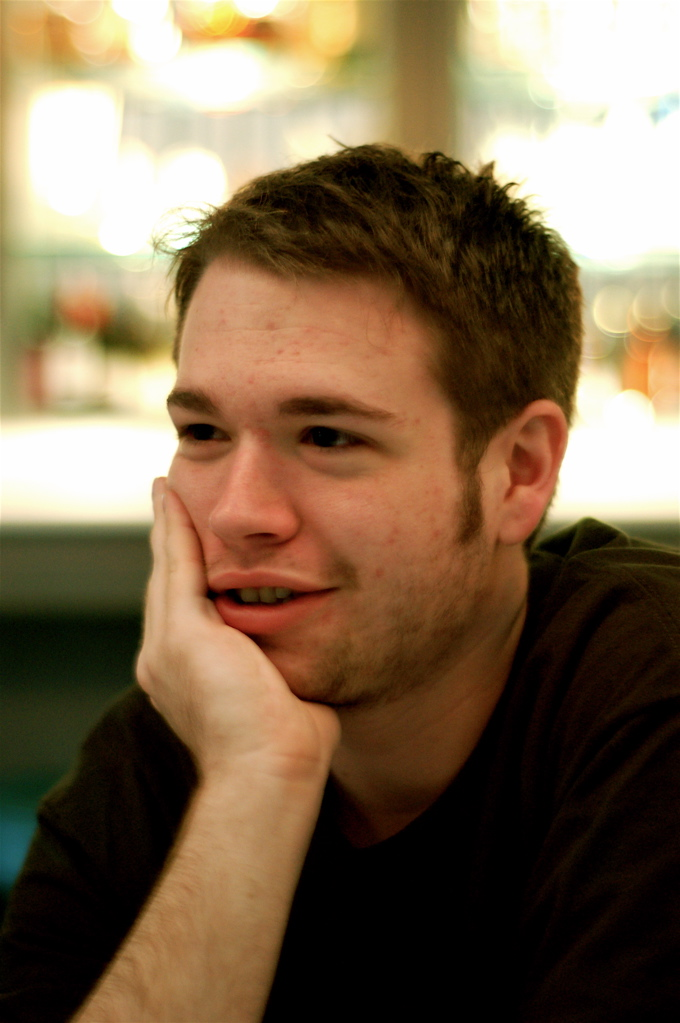
Kristan Reed (left) and Tom Bramwell (right) were former editors of Eurogamer.

In January 2008, Tom Bramwell succeeded Kristan Reed as editor-in-chief, a position he held until November 2014, marking the end of his 15-year tenure with Eurogamer. Afterwards Oli Welsh served as editor for Eurogamer, followed by Martin Robinson, Wesley Yin-Poole, Tom Phillips and Tom Orry. The current editor-in-chief is Chris Tapsell.

== Regional and other publications ==
=== Current ===
Eurogamer has several regional publications:

- Eurogamer.de for Germany; launched in co-operation with Extent Media on 24 August 2006 to coincide with that year's Games Convention exhibition.
- Eurogamer.es for Spain.
- Eurogamer.pl for Poland.
- Eurogamer.pt for Portugal; launched in partnership with LusoPlay in May 2008.

=== Former ===
- Eurogamer.cz for the Czech Republic.
- Eurogamer Benelux for Belgium, the Netherlands and Luxembourg (under Eurogamer.nl); launched in August 2008 and headed by Steven De Leeuw.
- Brasilgamer for Brazil; established in 2012.
- Eurogamer.dk for Denmark; launched in June 2009 and headed by Kristian West.
- Eurogamer.fr for France; launched as a joint venture with Microscoop in October 2007.
- Eurogamer.it for Italy; closed in 2022.
- Eurogamer.ro for Romania.
- Eurogamer.se for Sweden; established in 2015, closed in 2016.

==== Digital Foundry ====
From 2007 to 2025, Eurogamer hosted Digital Foundry, a video game technology blog founded in 2004 by Richard Leadbetter and Gary Harrod, due to a deal arranged by Leadbetter, who later sold parent Eurogamer Network half of it to support his video content. The Ringer recognized Digital Foundry for establishing the approach game technology videos employ to analyses games and hardware based on performance and the publication was used by Microsoft to unveil the Xbox One X hardware.

When Eurogamer's ownership first shifted in 2018, Leadbetter began seeking full control of Digital Foundry again. In August 2025, owner IGN agreed to sell Digital Foundry back to Leadbetter, with both Leadbetter and Eurogamer founder Rupert Loman paying equally for the cost of completing the sale. Leadbetter said that the outlet was profitable due to its Patreon funding of about $200,000 a year.

== Reception ==
Eurogamer has won several trade awards, including:

- 2007–2011 Best Website at the Games Media Awards.
- 2018 Online Editorial Team and Best Streamer at the Games Media Brit List.
- 2022 and 2024 Media Brand of the Year at MCV/Develop.
