= Future Gamer =

Future Gamer was an online video games e-zine created by Future Publishing.

== History ==
Future Gamer was launched in 1998 with Andy Smith as editor. FG as it became known to fans, was the world's first e-mail deliverable gaming magazine.

This business model was unsuccessful. FG ran for about 18 months before finally being reshaped into the UK version of Daily Radar, later GamesRadar.

== Staff ==
Amongst others:

- Andy Smith (Editor)
- Steve Bradley (Deputy Editor)
- Andy Ashwin
- Mark Eveleigh
- Alan Jarvie
- Amazing Bryan

== Community ==
FG spawned a close online community through its newsgroup. This included a Half Life clan ([FGC]_) that was featured in a subsequent advertising campaign.

Despite community pressure, at 00:00 on 23 May 2001 Future Publishing shut down their News Server in favour of Internet forums. This, along with the demise of the original magazine, led to the FG community seeking out a new home. It has endured to this day through a variety of newsgroups and is currently situated at vgj.forum on nntp.cheeseorsausage.com and at cheese or sausage.
