= Fire Chief (magazine) =

American magazine

- Categories: Trade magazine
- Founded: 1956
- Final issue: November 2013 (print)
- Company: Praetorian Group
- Country: United States
- Language: English
- Website: firechief.com
- ISSN: 0015-2552

Fire Chief is a magazine that was established in 1956. The magazine examines issues that are of particular importance to managers of fire departments. It was published in Chicago by Penton Media until 2013; in 2014 it was sold to Praetorian Group. The volumes for May 1968-Nov. 1991 were called also whole no. 134-415.
