= Guitar World =

American music magazine

- Cover of the January 2025 issue
- Categories: Music magazine (guitar focus)
- Frequency: Monthly
- Total circulation: 129,840 (December 2012)
- First issue: July 1980
- Company: Harris Publications (1980–2003); Future US, Inc. (2003–2012, 2018–present); NewBay Media (2012–2018)
- Country: United States
- Based in: New York City
- Language: English
- Website: guitarworld.com
- ISSN: 1045-6295

Guitar World is a monthly music magazine for guitarists and fans of guitar-based music and trends. The magazine has been published since July 1980. Guitar World, the best-selling guitar magazine in the United States, contains original artist interviews and profiles, plus lessons and columns with tablature and associated audio files or videos, gear reviews, news, and exclusive tablature for guitar and bass of three songs per issue. The magazine is published 13 times per year, including 12 monthly issues and a holiday issue, by Future plc. Damian Fanelli has been Guitar World's editor-in-chief since June 2018.

== History ==
=== 20th century ===
Stanley Harris, a New York magazine publisher, launched Guitar World magazine in July 1980. The magazine's debut issue featured bluesman Johnny Winter on the cover and included pieces on the Allman Brothers Band, George Thorogood and pedal steel guitars. Guitar World's debut issue was only 82 pages, had a very small staff and budget, and was not published on a regular monthly schedule for about the first 12 years of its publication.

By 1984, GW began to grow, as ownership looked to expand into other markets and demographics. The same year, Guitar Heroes, a one-shot guide to more than 100 of the greatest guitar players of all time, was published. In early 1992, this idea was revived as the semiannual Guitar World Legends, but with each issue conceived as a tribute to an artist or genre. As former editor-in-chief Brad Tolinski wrote in the magazine's 40th-anniversary issue, "It was a decent start, but the design and editorial content was still a bit lackluster. If you compared it to an amp, GW's first few issues were a sturdy 40-watt tweed combo, when what Harris really wanted was a row of 100-watt Marshalls."

Dennis Page, an advertising rep, hired a new editor-in-chief, Noe Goldwasser, also known as Noe Gold; Gold made inroads with metal music fans, printing the first of many cover stories with Eddie Van Halen. He edited several landmark issues in the magazine's first decade, including GW's fifth anniversary issue in 1985, which featured a cover-to-cover celebration of Jimi Hendrix; and a July 1986 tribute to Led Zeppelin's Jimmy Page, featuring a 15-page interview with the reclusive legend, along with early note-for-note transcriptions of Page solos to Stairway to Heaven and Rock and Roll.

When Gold left the magazine in 1988, he was replaced by editor-in-chief Joe Bosso and executive editor Matt Resnicoff. The two had divergent tastes in music, with Bosso preferring to cover rock 'n' roll and Resnicoff preferring jazz-fusion, leading to a split approach in the magazine's coverage. As publisher Page said, "For a time the magazine lost its way. We started including a lot of jazz, which our readers didn't care about. I knew the key was for us to get younger, not older."

In 1989, Tolinski was asked to step into the magazine's lead role. "One glance at the May and June 1989 issues sums up the story," Tolinski wrote in 2020. "On one cover, a rather nervous-looking Allan Holdsworth hides timidly behind his Steinberger guitar, and on the next, Zakk Wylde explodes with pure animal fury while the headline screams SPECIAL REPORT! THE YOUNG GUNS OF METAL. GW went from black and white to full-on Technicolor."

=== 21st century ===
Tolinski remained with the magazine until April 2015, when he was replaced by Jeff Kitts, who had been on GW's editorial staff since the early 1990s. Kitts was replaced by Damian Fanelli, who has been GW's editor-in-chief since June 2018; Fanelli had been with the magazine since 2011, originally as its online managing editor, later becoming its managing editor.

In July 2015, a photo of Guitar World's annual "Gear Guide" featuring a model in a bikini placed next to a copy of Deerhoof's Satomi Matsuzaki on the cover of She Shreds, a magazine dedicated to female and non-binary guitarists, went viral on the internet.

Following criticism from the magazine and its readers, Guitar World's publisher, NewBay Media, announced in April 2016 that it would stop using women in bikinis on the covers of their annual "Gear Guides". This practice was further called out by St. Vincent (Annie Clark), who appeared on the cover of the magazine's January 2017 issue in a bikini t-shirt. Clark was the first woman to appear on the cover since Joan Jett in May 2015.

== Sister magazines ==
GW's first official sister publication was Guitar School, which debuted in 1989 and foundered in 1997 shortly after its name was changed to Maximum Guitar. In the summer of 1993 GW branched out with Country Guitar, which morphed into Guitar World Acoustic and lasted until 2007. Mid-2003 saw GW venturing into the bass market with the premiere of Guitar World's Bass Guitar, which eventually ceased operation with its Pete Wentz-fronted June 2007 issue.

Second to Guitar World was the Guitar One magazine, which was founded in 1998. The second best-selling US guitar magazine, which was owned by Cherry Lane Magazines, was sold as part of the company's desire to scale down its magazine roster. Both of the magazines were purchased by Future Network in 2003. That year the circulation for Guitar World was 180,000, while Guitar One's was 140,000. The last Guitar One publication was released in 2007, with Guitar World continuing in publication.

In the summer of 2009, GW's editorial staff launched Guitar Aficionado, a publication focusing on the high-end or luxury customers of rock and roll and guitarist markets. By 2017, Guitar Aficionado had become a casualty of cutbacks resulting from the purchase of NewBay Media by Future PLC.

Revolver, one of the leading hard rock and metal publications still in existence, was conceived as GW's sister publication in 1999. Revolver's debut issue in 2000 included an oral history of the Doors, a behind-the-scenes look at the Japanese pop scene, and members of Slipknot wearing fashionable men's suits. After only a few issues, Revolver was retooled from this eclectic approach and relaunched into the magazine metal fans know today.

GW was published by Harris Publications from 1980 to 2003 and by Future US from 2003 to 2012. NewBay Media took over from 2012 to 2018, until Future plc re-acquired the magazine in April 2018. Its sister publications include Guitar Techniques, Total Guitar, Guitarist, Guitar Player and Bass Player.

=== Key editorial personnel ===
- Editor-in-Chief – Damian Fanelli
- Senior Music Editor – Jimmy Brown
- Tech Editor – Paul Riario
- Associate Editors – Andy Aledort, Chris Gill
- Art Director – Mixie von Bormann

== GuitarWorld.com ==
GuitarWorld.com was first launched in 1994 as the online counterpart to Guitar World magazine. It is run by a separate team from the print publication, and posts guitar news, features, interviews, lessons, reviews and buyer's guides, as well as select content from the magazine. As of 2022, the site reached 3.3m users per month. Since 2020, it has hosted other Future guitar brands, including UK titles Guitarist, Total Guitar, Guitar Techniques as well as US title Bass Player, and Australian Guitar.

During Guitar World's NewBay Media era, the site was edited by Damian Fanelli, who is now the print magazine's Editor-in-Chief. Since 2019, GuitarWorld.com's Editor-in-Chief has been former MusicRadar Guitars Editor Michael Astley-Brown.
