= Institute of Industrial and Systems Engineers =

Professional society for the support of the industrial engineering profession

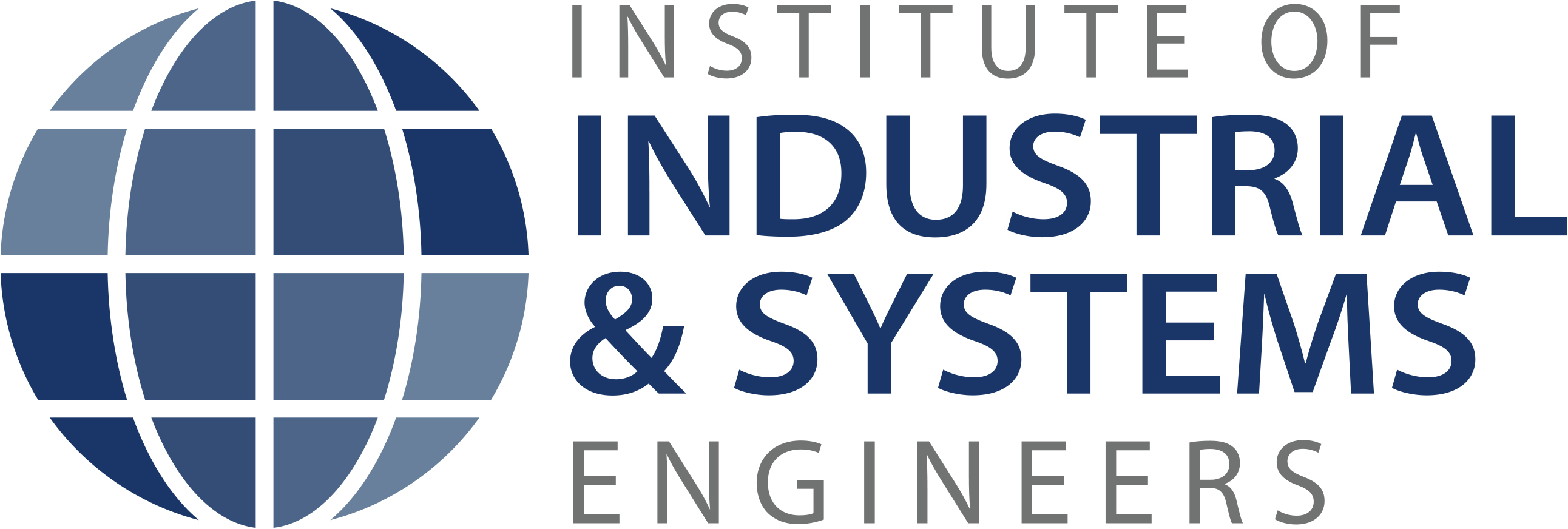
- Formation: 1948
- Headquarters: Peachtree Corners, Georgia
- Coordinates: 33°57′43.8″N 84°13′53.2″W
- Website: www.iise.org
- Formerly called: Institute of Industrial Engineers (1981–2016) American Institute of Industrial Engineers (1948–1981)

The Institute of Industrial and Systems Engineers (IISE), formerly the Institute of Industrial Engineers, is a professional society dedicated solely to the support of the industrial engineering profession and individuals involved with improving quality and productivity.

The institute was founded in 1948 as the American Institute of Industrial Engineers. In 1981, the name was changed to Institute of Industrial Engineers in order to reflect its international membership base. The name was changed again to the present Institute of Industrial and Systems Engineers in 2016 to reflect the changing scope of engineers working with large-scale, integrated systems.

Members include both college students and professionals. IISE holds annual regional and national conferences in the United States. IISE is headquartered in the United States in Peachtree Corners, Georgia, a suburb located northeast of Atlanta.

== Student Chapters ==
A student chapter is a group of industrial engineer students who have the initiative to be leaders among their classmates. Every college or university that offers an Industrial Engineer degree program is eligible to have an IISE student chapter. Students need to send a formal application to the organization and once it is approved, they will be assigned with a chapter number and a formal recognition. Then, a Faculty Advisor and Chapter Officers are elected. They will be the leaders for their department during an academic period, and have the challenge and responsibility to engage their classmates with learning and networking opportunities.

=== Board of Members ===
An Officer Slate has to be submitted by each Student Chapter at the beginning of the academic period. The main requirement to be part of the Board is paying for IISE's membership. Additionally, other requirements such as a minimum 3.00/4.00 GPA and extracurricular involvement are asked. Below, the structure for the Board is presented with their main duties:

- Student Chapter President: Strategic planning sessions to determine chapter goals, strategies and activities with all the team. Elaborate an Operations Plan and ensure activities are being done.
- Student Chapter Vice President: Oversee, coordinate and support the president with activities and board meetings. Compile information for Chapters Performance Report
- Finance Coordinator: Prepare annual budget and maintain chapter bank accounts balanced.
- Marketing Coordinator: Promote all activities among the industrial engineering community. Manage Instagram, Facebook and LinkedIn accounts
- Mentor Coordinator: Contact new members to welcome them to the chapter as well as motivate new students to join
- Logistics Coordinator: Organize the schedule for every month. Develop strategies to efficiently accomplish every activity.
- Congress Director: Coordinate with other chapters and countries networking activities

=== Benefits ===
1. Meeting other ISE students and IISE professional members: An IISE chapter provides a learning environment, full of opportunities to generate contacts with other students.

2. Programs and Events: IISE is constantly holding events, workshops and conferences. Students can participate in annual events as well as in paper and presentations competitions.

3. Developing Leadership Skills: Officers and members are constantly being leaders, and they strengthen their soft and organizational skills.

== Publications ==
IISE publishes two magazines and five technical journals.

- The institute's flagship journal is IISE Transactions, which publishes papers that are grounded in science and mathematics, as well as motivated by engineering applications. Published monthly, the journal focuses on the following topics:
  - Design and Manufacturing
  - Operations Engineering and Analytics
  - Data Science
  - Quality and Reliability
  - Supply Chain and Logistics
- The Engineering Economist is a quarterly refereed journal dealing with capital investments. It is refereed in collaboration with the Engineering Economy Division of the American Society of Engineering Education (ASEE).
- IISE Transactions on Healthcare Systems Engineering focuses on research in health systems. Published quarterly and covers applications of the following:
  - Healthcare Operations Management
  - Medical Decision Making
  - Socio-Technical Systems Analysis as related to healthcare
  - Quality Engineering
  - Healthcare Informatics
  - Healthcare Policy
- Prior to the 2018 title being ceased, the society had published the Journal of Enterprise Transformation containing research related to enterprise transformation, in collaboration with the International Council on Systems Engineering (INCOSE).
- IISE Transactions on Occupational Ergonomics and Human Factors is devoted to ergonomics and human factors research and techniques. The journal aims for covering the following topics:
  - Occupational ergonomics and human factors theory, technology, application, and practice
  - Technology to improve human-system performance and enhance human health and safety
  - Physical, cognitive, and organizational ergonomics and human factors
- Industrial Management, the publication of the institute's Society for Engineering and Management System, is a quarterly magazine on engineering management topics.
- The award-winning member magazine is ISE (formerly Industrial Engineer) and is published monthly.

== See also ==
Related topics

- International Council on Systems Engineering – Internal engineering trades organisation
- Industrial engineering – Branch of engineering which deals with the optimization of complex processes or systems
- Systems engineering – Interdisciplinary field of engineering
- Engineering management
- Manufacturing engineering – Branch of engineering
- Operations research – Discipline concerning the application of advanced analytical methods
- Operations engineering
- Enterprise engineering – Body of knowledge used to design an enterprise
- Maintenance engineering – Engineering discipline
- Production engineering – Branch of engineering
- Quality engineering – Principles and practice of product and service quality assurance and control
- Human factors and ergonomics
- Project management – Practice of leading the work of a team to achieve goals and criteria at a specified time
- Safety engineering – Engineering discipline
- Engineering economics – Subset of economics
