= Facilities engineering =

Branch of engineering

Facilities Engineer
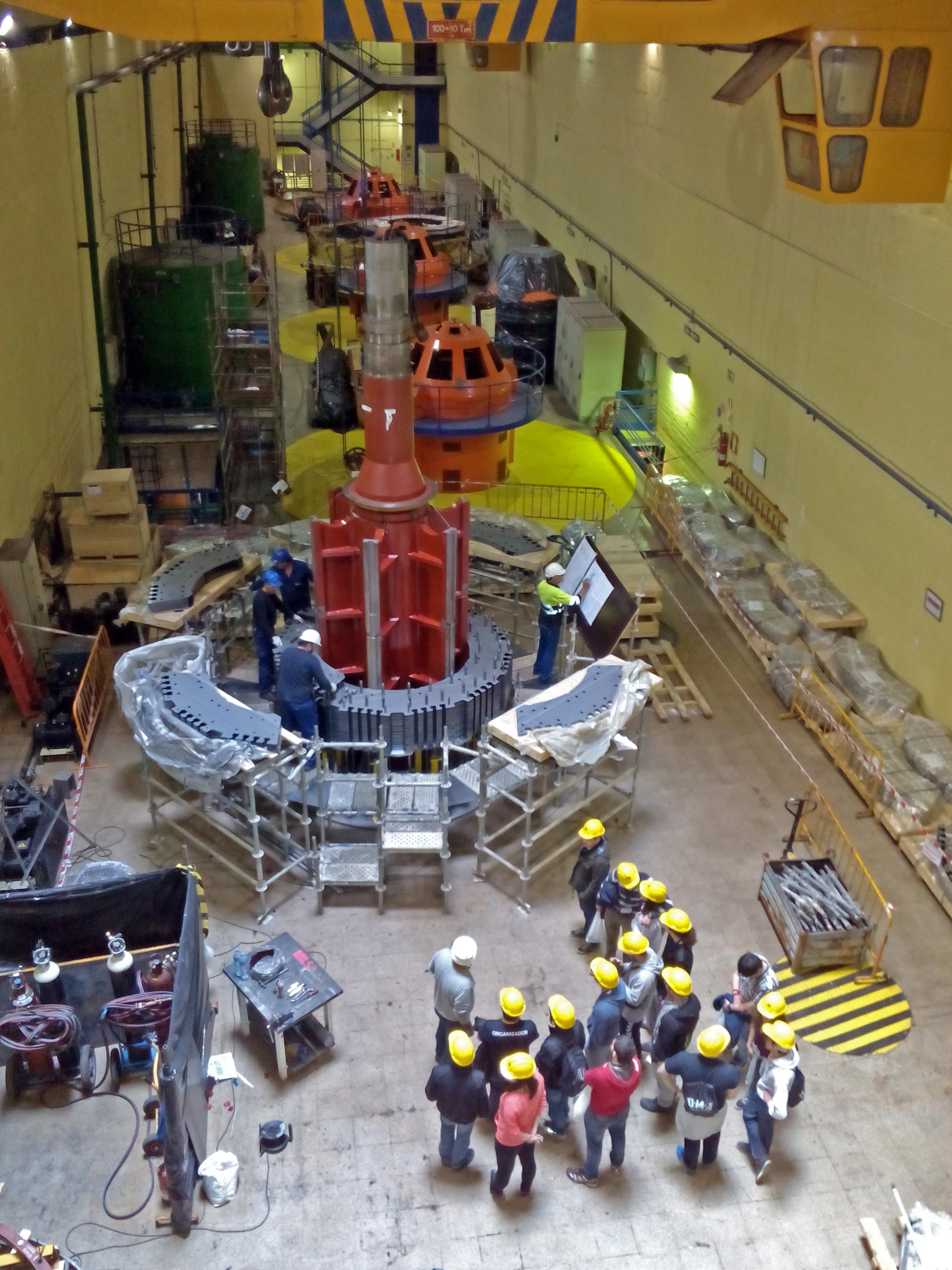

Occupation
- Names: Facilities Engineer

Description
- Competencies: Plant operations, design, organizational needs
- Fields of employment: Health care, Aerospace, Defence, Energy, Industries

Facilities engineering evolved from plant engineering in the early 1990s as U.S. workplaces became more specialized. Practitioners preferred this term because it more accurately reflected the multidisciplinary demands for specialized conditions in a wider variety of indoor environments, not merely manufacturing plants.

Today, a facilities engineer typically has hands-on responsibility for the employer's Electrical engineering, maintenance, environmental, health, safety, energy, controls/instrumentation, civil engineering, and HVAC needs. The need for expertise in these categories varies widely depending on whether the facility is, for example, a single-use site or a multi-use campus; whether it is an office, school, hospital, museum, processing/production plant, etc.

== History ==
The term Facilities Engineer emerged in the 1990s from the already existing vocation of a Plant Engineer. This evolution occurred in order to match the rapid advancements in technology at the time. There was a need for a more specialized and dynamic type of engineer, while still having the general background knowledge and experience of a plant engineer or a stationary engineer. These skills consisted of, but were not limited to: mechanical engineering, electrical engineering, environmental engineering, civil engineering, business management, statistical analysis, communications, and effective supervision skills. The result of this development was a jack-of-all-trades engineer who takes their specialization into a facility and helps it operate unhindered at its highest level of efficiency. That is to say that a facilities engineer is quite simply a plant engineer placed into a position where they must utilize a certain set of skills based upon the necessity of the employer. This need generally calls for hands-on maintenance but can also include managerial or even supervisory responsibilities. While the purpose of a facilities engineer may seem straight forward, the large variety in facilities within different industries calls for a very broad range of training.

== Responsibilities ==
Facilities engineers have the responsibility of establishing different projects in support of the plant's design and operation needs to be able to ensure an efficient and all the different aspects of safety are met up to standard. The industries that Facilities engineers can go into are the one that would typically require different plant layout plans, need organizational needs, and require different equipment and purchasing needs such as Health Care, Aerospace/Defense, and Energy/Utilities industries. They can also seek employment position such as operating engineer, a chief engineer, a facilities manager, maintenance foreman, or as a building maintenance supervisor. (learn.org) Facilities Engineers may be given management positions in the plants that they are working on to supervise the other facilities engineers and their license requirements, equipment provided, and getting the rights vendors hired to be able to meet the needs for the plant or facility. When working on certain projects, facilities engineers must meet the appropriate amount of resources such as hands and materials.

Due to the broad nature of a Facilities Engineer, the responsibilities utilized in one facility could be drastically different than in another. For example, a facilities engineer working at NASA Ames located at Moffet Field, would be responsible for helping to oversee and assist specialists in building, renovating/modernizing, and preserving the facilities on the campus; the facilities engineering branch also includes architectural engineering, civil engineering, structural engineering, mechanical engineering, electrical engineering, environmental engineering, and pressure system safety.

In short, the responsibilities entail any type of engineering support that goes on at the facilities' location in addition to the construction and renovation of the facilities themselves. While, a facilities engineer working for the Indian Health Service would be responsible to ensure that health care facilities and related support facilities are in a safe and functional condition. These skills entail civil engineering, mechanical engineering, and electrical engineering, as well as specialization in medical equipment, property management, and various aspects of engineering support.

Similarities lie in the maintenance of the physical structure of the facilities, while the differences are in regards to what machinery and systems are present within the facilities. This will differ based on the nature of the facility and its intended purpose. Other types of skills and projects can include inventive methods in order to increases in the energy efficiency of a facility. For example, a team of engineering and technical professionals and facilities engineers at Naval Base Coronado in San Diego, California successfully implemented a multipurpose solar power grid capable of providing enough power to sustain 935 homes per day, while also providing shade in their parking lot. This project ultimately provides greater energy efficiency, energy independence, and cost reduction for the facility in addition to contributing to and supporting renewable and sustainable energy.

== Careers ==
Facilities engineering is a broad study of engineering that makes it difficult to put facilities engineers into one category of jobs. According to a survey by Buildings.com the most common career fields for facilities engineer are construction, project management, facility management, energy management, design, staff engineering and staff architecture. While the aerospace and green building sector are not majority of employment for facilities engineering, the two sectors have grown and recruited heavily for facilities engineer in recent years. Another thing to consider is that most facilities engineers do not stay stationary in their careers. The careers of facilities engineer usually start off with operations, specialization, maintenance, and consulting. Then after years of experience most facilities engineers pursue positions as director of facilities, energy manager, facilities manager, facilities maintenance supervisor, and facilities planner.

== Day to Day Operations ==
1. Operations Engineer
  - Ensure a company's operations are working properly
  - Inspect operations, equipment and machinery
  - Plan for maintenance and upgrade machinery
  - Reduce or protect the company's product from defects
2. Specialist Engineer
  - Running diagnostics and test on specific machinery
  - Determining the problems of the machinery by examining test
  - Analyze the cost to repair or maintenance required to specific machinery
  - Work on the specific machinery to fix or maintenance require
3. Maintenance Engineer
  - Installation and maintenance of industrial equipment
  - routine inspections and preventive maintenance of equipment
  - troubleshooting issues on industrial equipment
  - make on site repairs
4. Consulting Engineer
  - Understand and analyze an engineering system of different clients
  - Find improvements or solutions in the engineering systems
  - Calculate numbers to show clients savings, advantages and cost
  - Plan the operations need to complete the project
  - Sell the project to the client
  - Analyzing, designing, and developing basic systems and plants knowledge to be able to improve quality and production
  - Lead/analyze projects and technical responsibilities that a typical facility would have to go through on a day-to-day basis
  - Be able to be a leader and function well in professional teams and overlooking staff/workers in a project
  - Being able to Communicate effectively with different methods such as speaking and writing, and be able to argue efficiently and compellingly when having the positions of a foreman, manager or a supervisor
  - Knowing professional and ethical morals when pushing forward the safety and regulation of a system operating efficiently and having the maintenance skills to be able to solve any problems presented

== Training ==
Due to a major advancement in industrial and commercial construction, in conjunction with a highly increased emphasis on energy efficiency, it is not uncommon for colleges and universities to have courses and degrees specifically allocated to facilities engineering. For example, in the late 1990s Purdue University created a graduate course with an emphasis on the various mechanical engineering, electrical engineering, and control skills necessary to maintain and increase the efficiency of these facilities. These skills consist of: mechanical measurements, calculations, basics of HVAC, the piping included in systems and associated equipment, efficiency in electricity and power, induction motors and variable speed drives, electrical systems, wiring, and lighting. Since facilities engineering has such a broad scope due to its wide array of necessary skills, courses tend to include education and hands-on training in virtually every aspect of engineering. This includes principles from software engineering and basic programming and coding in at least one language. However, the main focuses of these facilities engineering degrees tend to be on HVAC and energy efficiency. Other methods of training are certification courses sponsored and offered by the Association for Facilities Engineers. The Association for Facilities Engineers (AFE) was created by the American Institute of Plant Engineers, which was consisted of a highly regarded group of like-minded engineers or aspiring engineers who shared a common goal. This goal was to create new methods in which facilities engineers, plant engineers, facilities managers, and facility supervisors could become more efficient and productive in their various trades. This in turn would not only benefit the prospective engineers and managers, but was also intended to help economically advance the industries in which these trainees work. These certifications help to train engineers, supervisors, and maintenance managers in accordance with the methods necessary to maintain and efficiently work in and/or run a plant operating based on modern technological standards. With all of this training facilities engineers are capable of working in just about any facility, which can come in some variety.

== Educational Requirements ==
Facilities engineers are not required to have at least a bachelor's degree but most of them do for experience and it is not unusual to see many facilities engineers with master's degrees in the given fields. They must have that degree in either structural engineering, mechanical engineering, or manufacturing engineering. Most employers require one to have 3–10 years of experience before they will consider someone as eligible for the given job. Depending on how skilled the job is. Licensure and certification are required by a lot of employers, consisting of a professional engineer license, an EPA certification and boiler operator license, and an EPA certification. EPA also was known as Environmental Protection Agency is in charge of protecting human health and the environment, and the certificate for Facilities engineer makes sure the person receiving the certificate is well aware of these dangers. Most importantly all Facilities engineers must be able to problem. solve, be able to communicate there verbal and written skills, know the building process of the specific job, and know the specific code requirements for the given job. Some facilities engineers can the bachelors in science degree and required license but they can also receive an associate degree applied in science for Facilities engineering technology.

=== Course Work Requirements ===
The subjects that a Facilities engineer is typically required to know is:

Facilities Engineering Technology Curriculum
	Fall		Spring	Fall		Spring		Fall		Spring		Fall		Spring	
	Freshmen			Sophomore				Junior Year				Senior			
Science	General Chemistry and Lab		Chemistry of Plant Processes	Engineering Physics I and Lab		Engineering Physics II									
Engineering	Engineering Graphics											Engineering Management		Facilities Management	Engineering Ethics
Engineering Plant Operations	Plant Operations 1	Welding		Plant Op. II	Manufacturing Processes I	Steam Plant Watch Team Management		Facilities Engineering Diagnostics Lab		Plant Operations III	Introduction to Power Generation Plants				
Engineering Plant Operations	Intro to Marine Eng. and Lab	Welding		Boilers	Steam Plant System Operations	Turbines		Facilities Engineering Diagnostics Lab		Manufacturing Processes II	Introduction to Power Generation Plants				
Engineering Technology	Intro to Engineering Technology			Programming App. for Eng. Tech Majors Lab		Properties of Materials	Statics	Properties of Materials Lab	Electrical Circuits and Lab	Fluid Mechanics and Lab	Refrigeration and Air Conditioning and Lab	Electrical Machinery and Lab	Instrumentation and Measurement and Lab	Automation and Lab	Power Engineering Technology and Lab
Engineering Technology	Intro to Engineering Technology			Programming App. for Eng. Tech Majors Lab		Properties of Materials	Statics	Dynamics	Strength of Materials	Electronics and Lab	Refrigeration and Air Conditioning and Lab	Heating, Ventilation, and A/C and Lab		Automation and Lab	Power Engineering Technology and Lab
Engineering Technology	Intro to Engineering Technology			Programming App. for Eng. Tech Majors Lab		Properties of Materials	Statics	Thermodynamics							
Mathematics	College Algebra and Trigonometry		Calculus I	Calculus II											

== Employment ==
Additionally the US Department of Defense (DoD) has created a Facilities Engineering career field as part of the Acquisition, Technology, and Logistics workforce. That career field is not limited to indoor environments. In the DoD, the field also encompasses Real Estate, Ranges and the management of Linear Structures such as roadways, fences, and pipelines. DoD offers three levels of certification for professionals in this field.

The licenses and level of education that come with working as a Facilities Engineer relates to different positions such as Mechanical Engineer, Civil Engineer, or working as a construction manager in major or minor projects.

The salary is dependent on position, degree level, and the number of years of experience. The median salary for a Facilities Engineer with a bachelor's degree in FE (Facilities Engineering) is $72,093. Their annual salaries can range from $42,475-$120,801.

=== Associations ===
- Association for Facilities Engineering (AFE)

== Areas of Research ==
The research done by facilities engineer is involved in the energy sector. Facilities engineer try to find new ways in order to improve efficiency and save power for industrial equipment and buildings. This has pushed many innovations in the move to green buildings and energy storage. The green building movement has caused research into how to reduce energy waste in industrial buildings. Some of the innovations involve smart lights, thermal curtains, cool roofs, green insulation and rainwater storage. The goal of the green building is to make a building that is sustainable and has no negative impact on the environment. The energy storage research focus on innovating new equipment to store energy in off-peak hours and use during peak hours. These new innovations technologies range from flywheel storage to hydrogen production during off-peak hours.
