= Evgeni Genishta =

Russian scientist

Evgeni Nikolaevich Genishta
- Born: Evgeni Nikolaevich Genishta; Евгений Николаевич Гени́шта; 8 April 1908; Kazan, Russian Empire
- Died: 3 November 1991 (aged 83); Moscow, USSR
- Occupation: specialist in the field of radio engineering

Evgeni Nikolaevich Genishta (Russian: Евгений Николаевич Гени́шта; 8 April 1908, Kazan ― 3 November 1991, Moscow) was a Soviet scientist and a specialist in the field of radio engineering.

== Biography ==
He was born on 8 April 1908 in Kazan and was a son of General Nikolay Ivanovich Genishta.

After graduating in 1929 from Moscow Technical School of Communications, he was sent to work at "Mosetletrik" plant, where he began his professional career. He was not allowed to get higher education because of his ancestry. A year later he became an engineer at a radio laboratory and participated in the development of a broadcast radio receiver. The receivers of the series had been produced in large numbers since 1932.

In 1933―1934, Genistha developed a radio-based radio receiver BI-234. In 1936, it began to be produced at the Voronezh factory "Electrosignal" in large quantities and was popular with radio listeners. In 1935, the Institute of Communications and Moscow Power Engineering Institute invited Evgeni Genishta to read the course of Design and Calculation of Receiving Devices, the lecture summary of which was published in 1937 by Moscow Power Engineering Institute as a university textbook, which in 1939 was reissued by Moscow Electrotechnical Institute of Communications Engineers.

In the prewar and war years, Evgeni Nikolayevich was engaged in the creation of radio equipment for Soviet ground forces and aviation. In particular, he created field radio stations: RB and later modernized RBM and radio station 13-R. In 1943-1945 he developed radar instruments: an airborne radio altimeter and a device for identification friend or foe. After World War II, in 1946, he created "Rodina" radio. In 1946-1947 under his guidance was developed first serial TV in USSR, 625-line standard "Moskvich T-1".

After that he again switched to military research. He developed radio engineering units for missiles and aerial bombs for USSR nuclear shield. In 1963, he was moved to the Research Institute of Radio Engineering, where he headed the newly formed direction for the creation of radar homing heads for guided air-to-air missiles.

He died in Moscow on 3 November 1991 and was buried at Novodevichy Cemetery.

== Honours ==
- Order of Lenin
- Stalin Prize and USSR State Prize
- Order of the Red Star
