= Licensing.biz =

British trade magazine for the licensing industry

- Editor: Samantha Loveday; Billy Langsworthy
- Staff writers: Jade Burke
- Categories: Trade magazine Online magazine
- Founded: 2007
- Company: Intent Media (2007-2012); NewBay Media (2012-2018); Future plc (2018-2019); Datateam Media Group (present)
- Country: United Kingdom
- Based in: Hertford, Hertfordshire
- Language: English
- Website: www.licensing.biz

Licensing.biz is an online trade magazine published by Biz Media, a subsidiary of Datateam Media Group and based in Hertford, Hertfordshire. Originally aimed at European members of the licensing industry, it has since expanded to cover the trade worldwide.

== History ==
Licensing.biz was founded in 2007 by Intent Media, which was acquired by NewBay Media in 2012. At the time of its creation, the managing director and publisher was Stuart Dinsey. Dinsey left the position in October 2013.

As of 2016, Licensing.biz receives about 52,000 monthly readers from over one hundred countries.

In 2018, NewBay was acquired by Future US.

In January 2019, Future sold some B2B brands (including Licensing.biz) to Datateam Media Group, Biz Media was formed as the parent company.

== Licensing.biz People Awards ==
On 30 April 2015, Licensing.biz introduced the People Awards ceremony, held in London. On 11 March 2016, the second annual awards show was held in the same city, hosted by BBC 6 Music presenter Shaun Keaveny. The event recognises successful companies involved in the licensing business.
