= Radio World =

Trade newspaper covering radio broadcasting technology and operations

- Managing Director, Content: Paul McLane
- Frequency: Biweekly
- Publisher: Future US
- First issue: 1977
- Country: United States
- Based in: Washington, D.C.
- Language: English
- Website: www.radioworld.com
- ISSN: 0274-8541

Radio World is a trade journal published by Future US targeted at radio broadcast executives and operations personnel worldwide. Multiple editions have been published for the United States, Canada, Europe, the Middle East, Africa, Asia, and the Caribbean in English, Spanish, Portuguese, and French. Columnists range from broadcast industry consultants to legal counsel specializing in the broadcast industry.

Radio World was founded in 1977 by IMAS Publishing and was privately held until IMAS was acquired by NewBay Media in 2007. Future plc acquired NewBay in April 2018.

Sister publications include Radio, TV Tech, Videography, Government Video, TVB, and DV.com.

An unrelated Radio World magazine was published by Hennessy Radio Publications Corp. from 1922 to 1939.

== List of editions ==
- Radio World (1977 – )
- Radio World Engineering Extra (2004 – )
- Radio World Magazine (1994 – 1995)
- Tuned In: Radio World's Management Magazine (1996 – 1998)
- Radio World International (1989 – 2019)
- Radio World International Engineering Extra (2006 – 2008)
- Radio World América Latina (1989 – 2016)
- Radio World édition francophone (2001 – 2016)
