= Industrial engineering =

Branch of engineering which deals with the optimization of complex processes or systems

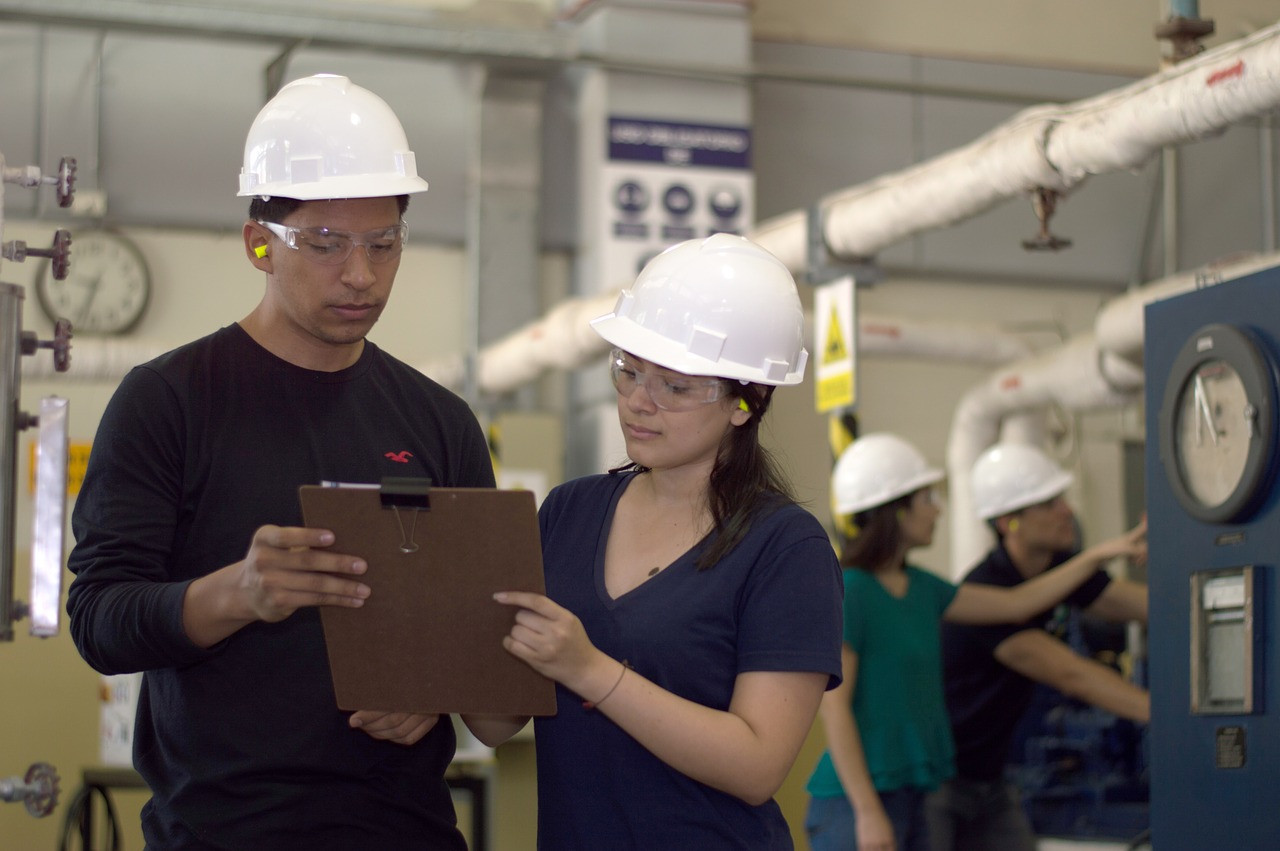
Industrial engineers in a factory

Industrial engineering (IE) revolves around the design, improvement and installation of integrated systems of people, materials, information, equipment and energy. It draws upon specialized knowledge and skill in the mathematical, physical, and social sciences together with the principles and methods of engineering analysis and design, to specify, predict, and evaluate the results to be obtained from such systems. Industrial engineering is a branch of engineering that focuses on optimizing complex processes, systems, and organizations by improving efficiency, productivity, and quality. It combines principles from engineering, mathematics, and business to design, analyze, and manage systems that involve people, materials, information, equipment, and energy. Industrial engineers aim to reduce waste, streamline operations, and enhance overall performance across various industries, including manufacturing, healthcare, logistics, and service sectors.

Industrial engineers are employed in numerous industries, such as automobile manufacturing, aerospace, healthcare, forestry, finance, leisure, and education. Industrial engineering combines the physical and social sciences together with engineering principles to improve processes and systems.

Several industrial engineering principles are followed to ensure the effective flow of systems, processes, and operations. Industrial engineers work to improve quality and productivity while simultaneously cutting waste. They use principles such as lean manufacturing, six sigma, information systems, process capability, and more.

These principles allow the creation of new systems, processes or situations for the useful coordination of labor, materials and machines. Depending on the subspecialties involved, industrial engineering may also overlap with, operations research, systems engineering, manufacturing engineering, production engineering, supply chain engineering, process engineering, management science, engineering management, ergonomics or human factors engineering, safety engineering, logistics engineering, quality engineering or other related capabilities or fields.

== History ==
=== Origins ===
==== Industrial engineering ====
The origins of industrial engineering are generally traced back to the Industrial Revolution with the rise of factory systems and mass production. The fundamental concepts began to emerge through ideas like Adam Smith's division of labor and the implementation of interchangeable parts by Eli Whitney. The term "industrial engineer" is credited to James Gunn who proposed the need for such an engineer focused on production and cost analysis in 1901. However, Frederick Taylor is widely credited as the "father of industrial engineering" for his focus on scientific management, emphasizing time studies and standardized work methods, with his principles being published in 1911. Notably, Taylor established the first department dedicated to industrial engineering work, called "Elementary Rate Fixing," in 1885 with the goal of process improvement and productivity increase. Frank and Lillian Gilbreth further contributed significantly with their development of motion studies and therbligs for analyzing manual labor in the early 20th century. The early focus of the field was heavily on improving efficiency and productivity within manufacturing environments, driven in part by the call for cost reduction by engineering professionals, as highlighted by the first president of ASME in 1880. The formalization of the discipline continued with the founding of the American Institute of Industrial Engineering (AIIE) in 1948. In more recent years, industrial engineering has expanded beyond manufacturing to include areas like healthcare, project management, and supply chain optimization.

==== Systems Engineering ====
The origins of systems engineering as a recognized discipline can be traced back to World War II, where its principles began to emerge to manage the complexities of new war technologies. Although systems thinking predates this period, the analysis of the RAF Fighter Command C2 System during the Battle of Britain (even though the term wasn't yet invented) is considered an early example of high-caliber systems engineering. The first known public use of the term "systems engineering" occurred in March 1950 by Mervin J. Kelly of Bell Telephone Laboratories, who described it as crucial for defining new systems and guiding the application of research in creating new services. The first published paper specifically on the subject appeared in 1956 by Kenneth Schlager, who noted the growing importance of systems engineering due to increasing technological complexity and the formation of dedicated systems engineering groups. In 1957, E.W. Engstrom further elaborated on the concept, emphasizing the determination of objectives and the thorough consideration of all influencing factors as requirements for successful systems engineering. That same year also saw the publication of the first textbook on the subject, "Systems Engineering: An Introduction to the Design of Large-Scale Systems" by Goode and Mahol. Early practices of systems engineering were generally informal, transdisciplinary, and deeply rooted in the application domain. Following these initial mentions and publications, the field saw further development in the 1960s and 1970s, with figures like Arthur Hall defining traits of a systems engineer and viewing it as a comprehensive process. Despite its informal nature, systems engineering played a vital role in major achievements like the 1969 Apollo moon landing. A significant step towards formalization occurred in July 1969 with the introduction of the first formal systems engineering process, Military Standard (MIL-STD)-499: System Engineering Management, by the U.S. Air Force. This standard aimed to provide guidance for managing the systems engineering process and was later extended and updated. The need for formally trained systems engineers led to the formation of the National Council on Systems Engineering (NCOSE) in the late 1980s, which evolved into the International Council on Systems Engineering (INCOSE). INCOSE further contributed to the formalization of the field through publications like its journal "Systems Engineering" starting in 1994 and the first edition of the "Systems Engineering Handbook" in 1997. Additionally, organizations like NASA published their own systems engineering handbooks. In the 21st century, international standardization became a key aspect, with the International Standards Organization (ISO) publishing its first standard defining systems engineering application and management in 2005, further solidifying its standing as a formal discipline.

=== Pioneers ===
Frederick Taylor (1856–1915) is generally credited as the father of the industrial engineering discipline. He earned a degree in mechanical engineering from Stevens Institute of Technology and earned several patents from his inventions. Taylor is the author of many well-known works, including a book, The Principles of Scientific Management, which became a classic of management literature. It is considered one of the most influential management books of the 20th century. The book laid our three goals: to illustrate how the country loses through inefficiency, to show that the solution to inefficiency is systematic management, and to show that the best management rests on defined laws, rules, and principles that can be applied to all kinds of human activity. Taylor is remembered for developing the stopwatch time study. Taylor's findings set the foundation for industrial engineering.

Frank Gilbreth (1868–1924), along with his wife Lillian Gilbreth (1878–1972), also had a significant influence on the development of Industrial Engineering. Their work is housed at Purdue University. In 1907, Frank Gilbreth met Frederick Taylor, and he learned tremendously from Taylor's work. Frank and Lillian created 18 kinds of elemental motions that make up a set of fundamental motions required for a worker to perform a manual operation or task. They named the elements therbligs, which are used in the study of motion in the workplace. These developments were the beginning of a much broader field known as human factors or ergonomics.

Through the efforts of Hugo Diemer, the first course on industrial engineering was offered as an elective at Pennsylvania State University in 1908. The first doctoral degree in industrial engineering was awarded in 1933 by Cornell University.

Henry Gantt (1861–1919) immersed himself in the growing movement of Taylorism. Gantt is best known for creating a management tool, the Gantt chart. Gantt charts display dependencies pictorially, which allows project managers to keep everything organized. They are studied in colleges and used by project managers around the world. In addition to the creation of the Gantt chart, Gantt had many other significant contributions to scientific management. He cared about worker incentives and the impact businesses had on society. Today, the American Society of Mechanical Engineers awards a Gantt Medal for "distinguished achievement in management and for service to the community."

Henry Ford (1863–1947) further revolutionized factory production with the first installation of a moving assembly line. This innovation reduced the time it took to build a car from more than 12 hours to one hour and 33 minutes. This continuous-flow inspired production method introduced a new way of automobile manufacturing. Ford is also known for transforming the workweek schedule. He cut the typical six-day workweek to five and doubled the daily pay. Thus, creating the typical 40-hour workweek.

Total quality management (TQM) emerged in the 1940s and gained momentum after World War II. The term was coined to describe its Japanese-style management approach to quality improvement. Total quality management can be described as a management system for a customer-focused organization that engages all employees in continual improvement of the organization. Joseph Juran is credited with being a pioneer of TQM by teaching the concepts of controlling quality and managerial breakthrough.

The American Institute of Industrial Engineering was formed in 1948. The early work by F. W. Taylor and the Gilbreths was documented in papers presented to the American Society of Mechanical Engineers as interest grew from merely improving machine performance to the performance of the overall manufacturing process, most notably starting with the presentation by Henry R. Towne (1844–1924) of his paper The Engineer as An Economist (1886).

=== Modern practice ===
From 1960 to 1975, with the development of decision support systems in supply such as material requirements planning (MRP), one can emphasize the timing issue (inventory, production, compounding, transportation, etc.) of industrial organization.

In the 1970s, with the penetration of Japanese management theories such as Kaizen and Kanban, Japan realized very high levels of quality and productivity. These theories improved issues of quality, delivery time, and flexibility. Companies in the west realized the great impact of Kaizen and started implementing their own continuous improvement programs. W. Edwards Deming made significant contributions in the minimization of variance starting in the 1950s and continuing to the end of his life.

In the 1990s, following the global industry globalization process, the emphasis was on supply chain management and customer-oriented business process design. The theory of constraints, developed by Israeli scientist Eliyahu M. Goldratt (1985), is also a significant milestone in the field.

== Etymology ==
While originally applied to manufacturing, the use of industrial in industrial engineering can be somewhat misleading, since it has grown to encompass any methodical or quantitative approach to optimizing how a process, system, or organization operates. In fact, the industrial in industrial engineering means the industry in its broadest sense. People have changed the term industrial to broader terms such as industrial and manufacturing engineering, industrial and systems engineering, industrial engineering and operations research, or industrial engineering and management.

== Sub-disciplines ==
There are numerous sub-disciplines associated with industrial engineering, including the following a non-exhaustive list. While some industrial engineers focus exclusively on one of these sub-disciplines, many deal with a combination of sub-disciplines. The first 14 of these sub-disciplines come from the IISE Body of Knowledge. These are considered knowledge areas, and many of them contain an overlap of content.

- Work design and measurement
- Operations research and analysis
- Engineering economic analysis
- Facilities engineering and energy management
- Quality engineering and reliability engineering
- Ergonomics and human factors in engineering and design
- Operations engineering and operations management
- Supply chain management
- Engineering management
- Safety
- Information engineering
- Design and manufacturing engineering
- Product design and product development
- Systems design and systems engineering
- Facilities engineering
- Logistics
- Systems engineering
- Healthcare engineering
- Project management

== Education ==
Industrial engineering students take courses in work analysis and design, process design, human factors, facilities planning and layout, engineering economic analysis, production planning and control, systems engineering, computer utilization and simulation, operations research, quality control, automation, robotics, and productivity engineering.

Various universities offer Industrial Engineering degrees across the world. The Edwardson School of Industrial Engineering at Purdue University, the H. Milton Stewart School of Industrial and Systems Engineering at Georgia Institute of Technology, and the Department of Industrial and Operations Engineering at the University of Michigan are all named industrial engineering departments in the United States. Other universities include: Virginia Tech, Texas A&M, Louisiana State University, Northwestern University, University of Wisconsin–Madison, and the University of Southern California, and NC State University.

It is important to attend accredited universities because ABET accreditation ensures that graduates have met the educational requirements necessary to enter the profession. This quality of education is recognized internationally and prepares students for successful careers.

Internationally, industrial engineering degrees accredited within any member country of the Washington Accord enjoy equal accreditation within all other signatory countries, thus allowing engineers from one country to practice engineering professionally in any other.

Universities offer degrees at the bachelor, master, and doctoral levels.

=== Undergraduate curriculum ===
2025 U.S. News undergraduate rankings
University	Rank
Georgia Institute of Technology	1
Purdue University	2
University of Michigan	3
Virginia Tech	3
University of California, Berkeley	5
Northwestern University	6
Stanford University	7
Cornell University	8
University of Illinois Urbana-Champaign	8
Texas A&M University	10

In the United States, the undergraduate degree earned is either a Bachelor of Science (BS) or a Bachelor of Science and engineering (BSE) in industrial engineering (IE). In South Africa, the undergraduate degree is a bachelor of engineering (BEng). Variations of the title include Industrial & Operations Engineering (IOE), and Industrial & Systems Engineering (ISE or ISyE).

The typical curriculum includes a broad math and science foundation spanning chemistry, physics, mechanics (i.e., statics, kinematics, and dynamics), materials science, computer science, electronics/circuits, engineering design, and the standard range of engineering mathematics (i.e., calculus, linear algebra, differential equations, statistics). For any engineering undergraduate program to be accredited, regardless of concentration, it must cover a largely similar span of such foundational work, which also overlaps heavily with the content tested on one or more engineering licensure exams in most jurisdictions.

The coursework specific to IE entails specialized courses in areas such as optimization, applied probability, stochastic modeling, design of experiments, statistical process control, simulation, manufacturing engineering, ergonomics/safety engineering, and engineering economics. Industrial engineering elective courses typically cover more specialized topics in areas such as manufacturing, supply chains and logistics, analytics and machine learning, production systems, human factors and industrial design, and service systems.

Certain business schools may offer programs with some overlapping relevance to IE, but the engineering programs are distinguished by a much more intensely quantitative focus, required engineering science electives, and the core math and science courses required of all engineering programs.

=== Graduate curriculum ===
2025 U.S. News graduate rankings
University	Rank
Georgia Institute of Technology	1
University of Michigan	2
Purdue University	3
University of California, Berkeley	3
Northwestern University	3
Stanford University	6
Virginia Tech	7
Texas A&M	7
University of Wisconsin, Madison	7
Massachusetts Institute of Technology	10
Cornell University	10
University of Southern California	10

The usual graduate degree earned is the Master of Science (MS), Master of Science and engineering (MSE) or master of engineering (MEng) in industrial engineering or various alternative related concentration titles.

Typical MS curricula may cover:

- Manufacturing Engineering
- Analytics and machine learning
- Computer-aided manufacturing
- Engineering economics
- Human factors engineering and ergonomics (safety engineering)
- Lean Six Sigma
- Management sciences
- Materials management
- Operations management
- Operations research and optimization techniques
- Predetermined motion time system and computer use for IE
- Product development
- Production planning and control
- Productivity improvement
- Project management
- Reliability engineering and life testing
- Robotics
- Statistical process control or quality control
- Supply chain management and logistics
- System dynamics and policy planning
- Systems simulation and stochastic processes
- Time and motion study
- Facilities design and work-space design
- Quality engineering
- System analysis and techniques

== See also ==
=== Notable Associations and Professional Organizations ===
- Institute of Industrial and Systems Engineers (IISE)
- Human Factors and Ergonomics Society (HFES)
- Society of Manufacturing Engineers (SME)
- American Production and Inventory Control Society (APICS)
- Institute for Operations Research and the Management Sciences (INFORMS)
- American Society for Quality (ASQ)
- The International Council on Systems Engineering (INCOSE)

=== Notable Conferences ===
- IISE Annual Conference
- INFORMS Annual Conference

=== Related topics ===
- Engineering economics – Subset of economics
- Engineering management
- Enterprise engineering – Body of knowledge used to design an enterprise
- Environment, health and safety – Balance of occupational safety and environmental protection
- Financial Engineering – Application of mathematical and computational practices in finance
- Human factors and ergonomics
- Lang factor – Ratio used in industrial engineering
- Industrial and production engineering – Branch of engineering
- Industrial design – Process of design
- Maintenance engineering – Engineering discipline
- Manufacturing engineering – Branch of engineering
- Occupational safety and health – Field concerned with the safety, health and welfare of people at work
- Operations engineering
- Operations research – Discipline concerning the application of advanced analytical methods
- Outline of production – Overview of and topical guide to production
- Overall equipment effectiveness – Measure of how well a manufacturing operation is utilized
- Process engineering – Study of making products from raw materials
- Product design – Process of development of new products
- Product engineering – Branch of engineering
- Production engineering – Branch of engineering
- Project management – Practice of leading the work of a team to achieve goals and criteria at a specified time
- Project production management – Management method for production projects
- Quality engineering – Principles and practice of product and service quality assurance and control
- Reverse engineering – Process of extracting design information from anything artificial
- Safety engineering – Engineering discipline
- Sales process engineering – Systematic design of sales processes
- Sociotechnical system – Organizational development approach
- Statistical process control – Method of quality control
- Systems engineering – Interdisciplinary field of engineering
- Toyota Production System – Management system developed by Toyota
- The Toyota Way – Set of managerial and production principles
- Fordism – Ford's assembly-line mass production and consumption manufacturing system
