= Electronic Design (magazine) =

Electronics and electrical engineering trade magazine

- Cover for the Fall 2023 issue
- Senior Content Director: William G. Wong
- Managing Editor: Roger Engelke Jr.
- Senior Editor: David Maliniak
- Senior Staff Editor: James Morra
- Editor: Alix Paultre
- Technology Editor: Andy Turudic
- Former editors: previous_editors Joe Desposito; David Bursky; Roger Allan; Lucinda Mattera; George Rostky; Howard Bierman
- Categories: Electronics, Trade magazine
- Frequency: Monthly
- Format: A4
- Circulation: 115,000
- Publisher: Bill Baumann
- Founded: December 1952; 73 years ago
- First issue: December 1952; 73 years ago
- Company: Endeavor Business Media
- Country: United States
- Based in: McGraw Hill Education: New York City; Penton: Hasbrouck Heights, New Jersey
- Language: English
- Website: www.electronicdesign.com
- ISSN: 0013-4872 (print); 1944-9550 (web)
- OCLC: 1567748

Electronic Design magazine, founded in 1952, is an electronics and electrical engineering trade magazine and website.

== History ==
Hayden Publishing Company began publishing the bi-weekly magazine Electronic Design in December 1952, and was later published by InformaUSA, Inc.

In 1986, Verenigde Nederlandse Uitgeverijen, purchased Hayden Publishing Inc.

In June 1988, Verenigde Nederlandse Uitgeverijen, purchased Electronic Design from McGraw-Hill. In July 1989, Penton Media, purchased Electronic Design, then in Hasbrouck, N.J., from Verenigde Nederlandse Uitgeverijen.

In July 2007, Penton Media's OEM electronics publication, EE Product News, merged with Penton Media's "Electronic Design" magazine. EE Product News was founded in 1941, as a monthly publication.

In September 2016, Informa, purchased Penton Media, including Electronic Design.

In November 2019, Endeavor Business Media purchased Electronic Design from Informa.

== Content ==
Sections include Technology Reports (products), Engineering Essentials (new standards), Engineering Features (events), and Embedded in Electronic Design (embedded hardware and software). Design Solutions are contributed by field engineers and Ideas For Design are submitted by readers. Electronic Design also covers components. Techview presents news and products in the categories of Analog & Power, Digital, Electronic design automation, Communications, Test, and Wireless. The magazine covers emerging technologies and large-scale trends."Understanding Electronic Design and Its Peers". December 2020.

Six "big" issues are published per year. The Technology Forecast issue is published in January. In June, the Megatrends issue describes industry trends. The "Best" issue reviews the year's "best" designs, events and products. "Your Issue" covers topics from the annual reader survey results. "One Powerful Issue" covers Power and "Wireless Everywhere" covers Wireless.

Editorial staff include: William Wong, Senior Content Director; James Morra, Senior Editor; Andy Turudic, Technology Editor; Cabe Atwell, Technology Editor; Alix Paultre, Editor-at-Large; David Maliniak, Executive Editor Microwaves & RF; and Roger Engelke Jr., Managing Editor. "Contacts". August 2025.

== Notable contributor ==
Bob Pease was an electronics engineer and author employed by National Semiconductor Corporation who wrote a monthly column, Pease Porridge, about analog electronics, and answered letters.

== Distribution ==
The publication is free, in print and PDF, for qualified engineers and North American industry managers. It is also available online.

== See also ==
- EE Times
- EDN
- Electronics (magazine)
- Electronic News
- List of engineering journals and magazines
