= Broadcast technician =

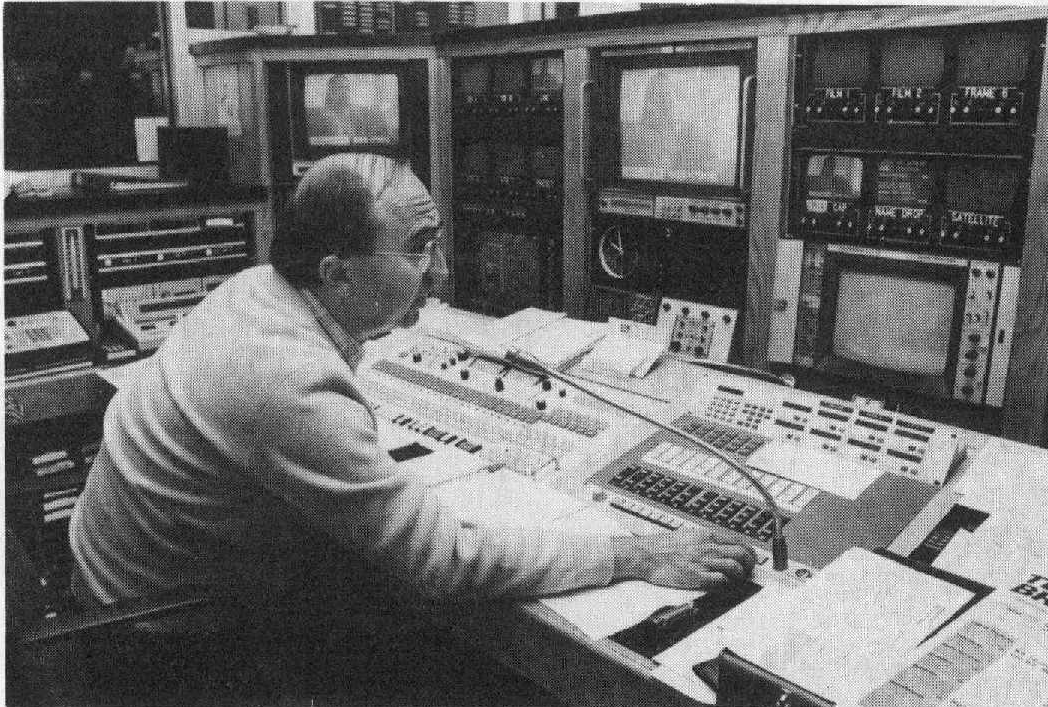
American broadcast technician at work. (1992)

In broadcast engineering, a broadcast technician is a professional responsible for the maintenance and operation of equipment used to record and transmit radio and television programs. They work with television cameras, microphones, tape recorders, light and sound effects, transmitters, antennas, and other equipment.
