= GamesRadar+ =

Video game website

- Screenshot of the website in late November 2024
- Website type: Video game website
- Available in: English
- Headquarters: {{{location_country}}}
- Owner: Future plc
- Editor: Sam Loveridge
- Website: gamesradar.com
- Registration: Optional
- Launched: 1999; 27 years ago

GamesRadar+ (formerly GamesRadar) is an entertainment website for video game-related news, previews, and reviews. It is owned by Future plc. In late 2014, Future Publishing-owned sites Total Film, SFX, Edge and Computer and Video Games were merged into GamesRadar, with the resulting, expanded website being renamed GamesRadar+ in November that year.

== Format and style ==
GamesRadar+ publishes numerous articles each day, including official video game news, reviews, previews, and interviews with publishers and developers. One of the site's features was their "Top 7" lists, a weekly countdown detailing negative aspects of video games themselves, the industry and/or culture. Today, they also publish "best games" lists segmented by genre, platform, or theme. These are divided into living lists, for consoles and platforms that are still active, and legacy lists, for consoles and platforms that are no longer a target for commercial game development.

== History ==
In December 2007, Texas filed a lawsuit against Future US, Future plc's U.S. subsidiary, for violating the Children's Online Privacy Protection Act by collecting data of children under 13 through GamesRadar without parental notice. The lawsuit alleges that the site "failed to include necessary disclosures and obtain parental consent before collecting personal information from children." The owner of the other website settled in March 2008, though the final disposition against Future plc is not public record.

In January 2011, GamesRadar released a freeware app for iOS (via the App Store), with which users could browse their cheats, guides and walkthroughs.

By February 2012, many of the long-standing writers and editors were either laid off or had moved on to other careers, including many recurring hosts and guests of the site's "TalkRadar" podcast, which at the time ended at episode 198. In November 2012, Keith Walker became the new publisher at Future Publishing, and thus GamesRadar, looking to improve "digital growth". By December 2012, the site underwent a drastic new redesign including new layout, interface and regular features along with new staff members and successor to TalkRadar podcast titled "RadioRadar".

In May 2014, it was reported that Future Publishing intended to close the websites of Edge, Computer and Video Games and their other video game publications. In September 2014, GamesRadar partner sites Total Film and SFX were merged into GamesRadar, and the resulting site was renamed GamesRadar+ the following November. In December 2014, it was confirmed that the previously closed Edge and Computer and Video Games sites would also be merged into GamesRadar+.

On 4 February 2016, Daniel Dawkins was announced to have been promoted GamesRadar+'s Global Editor-in-Chief. In 2019 he became Future's Content Director of Games and Film, and was replaced in the role of editor by Sam Loveridge. In May 2019, Rachel Weber was appointed as Managing Editor.

In 2020, the comics website Newsarama became part of GamesRadar+. In June 2020, GamesRadar+ began organizing digital showcase Future Games Show.

== Community ==
GamesRadar hosted numerous online message boards and forums from as early as 1998 in its original Future Gamer and then Daily Radar incarnation, including international versions such as GamesRadar.it. Future Publishing's enthusiast video and computer games magazines such as N64 Magazine often featured prevalent advertising for GamesRadar to encourage participation from readers. In 2008, the site moved towards a single login functionality for reader comments on articles and posting on forums, for which the newer US forums were chosen due to Future's strategic shift to garner US readership and compete with sites such as IGN. On 14 August 2008, it was announced that the UK forum would be closed down and merged with the US forums. Moderators of the original UK forums instead launched GRcade, occasionally noted for its own breaking news.
