= Develop (UK magazine) =

UK trade magazine

- Issue 179, February 2017
- Editor: Jem Alexander
- Categories: Video game industry
- Frequency: Monthly
- Format: Print, digital
- First issue: August 1996; 29 years ago
- Final issue Number: December 2017; 189
- Company: NewBay Media
- Country: United Kingdom
- Language: English
- ISSN: 1365-7240
- OCLC: 1064888058

Develop was a monthly UK trade magazine for the video game industry. Its online portal, complete with a digital version of the print publication, was active since July 2007.

Develop 100 was an annual rating system for game developers produced by Develop. It was a ranking of the world's games development studios based on a variety of criteria including sales data, critical success and industry standing.

The Develop Industry Excellence Awards, also annually, honoured the development of video games and award studios across a range of categories.

In November 2017, NewBay Media, the owner of Develop at the time, announced that the websites, magazines and events of Develop and sister magazine Esports Pro would be absorbed into MCV by early 2018, with the combined magazine moving to a monthly frequency.
