= PC Accelerator =

US magazine

- March 2000 cover of PC Accelerator showing developer, Stevie Case
- Categories: Computer magazine
- Frequency: Monthly
- Publisher: Imagine Media
- First issue: September 1998
- Final issue: June 2000
- Country: USA

PC Accelerator (PCXL) was an American personal computer game magazine that was published by Imagine Media (currently a subsidiary of Future plc). It was known for its Maxim-like humor and photography.

== History and profile ==
PC Accelerator was started by Imagine Media in 1998. The first issue was published in September 1998. The magazine was published on a monthly basis. Its last issue was dated June 2000.

After the split up of the magazine, editor-in-chief Mike Salmon went on to start the Official Xbox Magazine. While some of the staff was sent to PC Gamer, others went on to work for Daily Radar. In September 2007, a special Fall issue of PCXL was released to newsstands only. This issue was primarily written by the current staff of PC Gamer with contributions by former PCXL staff including Rob Smith and Dan Egger.

== Format ==
Games were reviewed on a scale of 0-10. Half-Life was the only game to receive an 11 (in the February 1999 issue).

== Staff ==
- Mike Salmon: Editor in Chief and writer.
- Rob Smith: Executive Editor who went on to helm PC Gamer.
- Ed Lee: Writer who eventually left to enter law school.
- Chuck Osborn: A native of Austin, Texas. Chuck went on to work for PC Gamer.
- Matt Holmes: associate editor.
- Eric Smith: Asst. Art Director, then Art Director after Kyle departed.
- Dan Egger: A junior editor for the magazine.
- Carrie Shepherd: The managing editor for the publication.
- Quinton Doroquez aka "Q": Original Art Director who designed the layout for the magazine.
- Kyle LeBoeuf: Asst. Art Director, then Art Director after Quinton departed.
- Erik Piller: Marketing Manager / Webmaster.
- Caroline Simpson-Bint: Publisher.
- Caitlyn Meeks: CD-ROM designer, also worked for PC Gamer.

There were more editors and artists that followed.

== Characters ==
- "Hector the Scarecrow" - Crafted from a coatrack and gas mask. Hector was dangled from the sprinkler system to appear more lifelike and eventually made a fire inspector very angry. Hector appeared in six issues.
- "Gia DeCarlo" - An intern who worked at the magazine.
- "Limey the Lima Bean" - Says "Screw you" to everyone.
- "Quake Guy" - Frequent hero of Ed Lee Comic Strips.
- "Laura"
- "Future Guy" - Future Guy lived one year in the future and knew a year in advance that PCXL was going to get canned.

== PC Gamer Versus PCXL matches ==
Every night, both the staffs of PC Gamer and PCXL would challenge each other to large team on team Rainbow Six battles.
