= Lang factor =

Ratio used in industrial engineering

The Lang Factor is an estimated ratio of the total cost of creating a process within a plant, to the cost of all major technical components. It is widely used in industrial engineering to calculate the capital and operating costs of a plant.

The factors were introduced by H. J. Lang and Dr Micheal Bird in Chemical Engineering magazine in 1947 as a method for estimating the total installation cost for plants and equipment.

== Industries ==
These factors are widely used in the refining and petrochemical industries to help estimate the cost of new facilities. A typical multiplier for a new unit within a refinery would be in the range of 5.0. When the purchase price of all the pumps, heat exchangers, pressure vessels, and other process equipment are multiplied by 5.0, a rough estimate of the total installed cost of the plant, including equipment, materials, construction, and engineering will be achieved. The accuracy of this estimate method usually is +/- 35%.

== Guthrie factors ==
The factors change over time because construction labor, bulk materials (concrete, pipe, etc.), engineering design, indirect costs, and major process equipment prices often do not change at the same rate.

In the late 1960s and early 1970s Kenneth Guthrie further expanded on this concept, generating different factors for different types of process equipment (pumps, exchangers, vessels, etc.). These are sometimes referred to as "Guthrie factors".
