= Mobile PC (magazine) =

- Publisher: Future Network USA
- First issue: June 14, 2004
- Final issue: November 2005
- Country: United States
- Language: English

Mobile PC was a monthly magazine covering mobile technology, including notebook computers, mobile phones, personal digital assistants, MP3 players, digital cameras, mobile game consoles, and other portable electronics.

== History and profile ==
The magazine was published by Future Network USA, its first issue was released on 14 June 2004. Founded as Mobile PC in 2003, then changed to Mobile in June 2005. Christopher Null was the first editor-in-chief. A cease and desist order on the use of the confusingly similar magazine name and website domain MobileMagazine.com was sent to Future Network USA. The print publication Mobile ceased publication in November 2005 due to undetermined reasons and the domain name MobileMagazine.com was transferred to Pilato Private Consulting.

The Mobile PC editorial staff included Christopher Null, Dylan Tweney, Robert Strohmeyer, Rachel Rosmarin, Roger Hibbert, and Mark McClusky. The design staff included Chris Imlay, Christina Empedocles, and Morgan McDermott. Mobile featured a monthly product design column by MAKE editor Mark Frauenfelder.

Outstanding subscriptions to Mobile PC were fulfilled by subscriptions to Maximum PC, a sister technical magazine.
