= Radio (magazine) =

Radio broadcasting trade publication

- Issue 1, January 1994
- Editor: Chris Scherer; 1997 to 2014
- Categories: Trade magazine
- Founded: 1994
- Company: Future US
- Country: United States
- Language: English
- ISSN: 1081-3357

Radio magazine, a radio broadcasting trade publication, covers the technology side of radio broadcasting. The publication is targeted at radio broadcast engineers, technology managers and owners of radio stations, networks, and recording studios. It is owned by Future US.

== History ==
Radio magazine was first published in 1994 under the title BE Radio. It is, essentially, a spin-off of Broadcast Engineering magazine, which began publication in 1959.

Prior to 1994, Broadcast Engineering (often known as "BE") covered radio, television, and cable broadcasting. In 1993, the editors of Broadcast Engineering, recognizing a growing divergence in the technical issues faced by radio and television broadcasting, chose to split the scope of the original magazine. This resulted in the creation of BE Radio, to cover only the radio broadcasting industry, and narrowed the scope of Broadcast Engineering to television and cable broadcasting only. For the first year of publication, BE Radio was a supplement mailed with Broadcast Engineering to subscribers working at radio stations. In 1995, BE Radio was mailed as a stand-alone publication.

By 1997, the editorial oversight from Broadcast Engineering had ceased, and the tagline "From the editors of Broadcast Engineering" was no longer used. The two publications were completely stand-alone under one publisher.

In time, the common lineage of the two magazines was less important, and the connection was not understood by many readers. With that, the "BE" initialism ceased to have relevance for BE Radio, and in 2002 the decision was made to drop the initials from the title, leading to the title of Radio. The March through August 2002 issues of Radio magazine have a small "BE" in the upper corner. This is because the postal permit was registered for BE Radio and not Radio, and the small addition to the cover satisfied postal regulations.

In February 2011, Radio was transferred from Penton Media to media and communications publisher NewBay Media, separating ownership of Radio from its sister publication Broadcast Engineering for the first time. Penton had decided to release all its entertainment technology titles. Future acquired NewBay Media in 2018.

The final issue of Radio magazine was published in December 2017.

== Earlier use of the name ==
Between November 1921 and February 1947 a Radio magazine was published on the west coast in either San Francisco or Los Angeles. Before 1921 it was known as Pacific Radio News and in 1947 it became Audio Engineering. The publication was highly regarded at the time, carrying articles from many of the top men in the craft. Pacific Radio Publishing also printed a series of yearly handbooks. Around 1959, William I. Orr became editor of the handbook and it achieved national distribution.
