= Electronic Musician =

American monthly music magazine

- Cover of the final issue (August 2023)
- Categories: Music
- Frequency: Monthly
- Founded: 1975
- Final issue: August 2023
- Company: Future US
- Country: USA
- Based in: San Bruno, California
- Language: English
- Website: Electronic Musician
- ISSN: 0884-4720

Electronic Musician was a monthly magazine published by Future US featuring articles on synthesizers, music production and electronic musicians.

== History and profile ==
Electronic Musician began as Polyphony magazine in 1975, published by PAiA Electronics as a synthesizer hobbyist magazine. In 1976, it was spun off as a separate company, Polyphony Publishing Company. It was sold to Mix Publications in 1985. Mix Publications was bought by Act III Communications around 1989, which in the 1990s was bought by Primedia Inc.. Primedia's business magazines were spun off as Prism Business Media in 2005; Prism merged with Penton Media the next year. NewBay Media bought the magazine in 2011. EQ Magazine was merged into Electronic Musician in May 2011. Future plc acquired NewBay in 2018. The headquarters is in San Bruno, California.

The magazine ceased publication after August 2023 issue.
