= MCV/Develop =

British trade magazine that focuses on the video game industry

- Cover of the September 2023 (#992), 25th anniversary edition issue
- Editor: Richie Shoemaker
- Categories: Video game industry trade magazine
- Frequency: Monthly
- Format: Print, digital
- Total circulation (2009): 10,065
- First issue: September 1998; 26 years ago
- Company: Biz Media
- Country: United Kingdom
- Language: English
- Website: mcvuk.com
- ISSN: 1469-4832
- OCLC: 499701071

MCV/Develop (formerly MCV and Market for Computer & Video Games) is a UK trade magazine that focuses on the business aspects of the video game industry. It is published monthly by Biz Media, a subsidiary of Datateam Media Group and is available in print and digitally. Originally named MCV, it absorbed the assets of sister magazines (including Develop) in 2018, and changed its name to MCV/Develop in 2019.

== History ==
MCV was started in September 1998 by former Computer Trade Weekly (CTW) employees Stuart Dinsey, editor, Lisa Carter (then Foster), deputy editor, Alex Moreham (then Jarvis), sales manager and Dave Roberts. CTW was published weekly from September 1984 and by 1998 was the official newspaper for ELSPA (The European Leisure Software Publishers Association) and the creator and sponsor of ECTS (European Computer Trade Show). Stuart Dinsey left MCV in 2013 after selling it a year earlier. Stuart is currently chairman of Curve Digital and a board director of Ukie.

In November 2017, NewBay Media, the owner of MCV at the time, announced that the websites, magazines and events of sister magazines Develop and Esports Pro would be absorbed into MCV by early 2018, with the combined magazine moving to a monthly frequency. NewBay Media was acquired by Future Publishing in April 2018. In December 2018, Future opted to sell several of its business-to-business brands, including MCV, to Datateam Media Group. The deal was completed in January 2019, with Datateam forming a new subsidiary, named Biz Media, as parent for Future's former brands. In October that year, MCV was rebranded MCV/Develop to resurrect the Develop brand following its closure in 2018.

Seth Barton was editor of MCV/Develop from 2016 to 2021, when he left to join PlayStation; he was replaced by Richie Shoemaker on 1 November 2021.

== MCV/Develop Awards ==
The MCV/Develop Awards are an annual award show, held since 2002, that is open to publishers, retail and distribution, with entries peer-voted and judged by an independent panel of specialists.
