= Penton (company) =

Information services company

- Industry: Information services and marketing services
- Founded: 1904
- Founder: John A. Penton
- Defunct: 2017
- Fate: Acquired by Informa
- Headquarters: 1166 Avenue of the Americas, New York, United States
- Key people: Patrick Martell, Informa's Integration Officer for Penton
- Products: Air Transport World; Aviation Week; Electronic Design; Farm Progress; IndustryWeek; Live Design; Machine Design; Nation's Restaurant News; SQL Server; Trusts & Estates; Ward's; Windows IT Pro
- Number of employees: 1200
- Website: penton.com

Penton was an information services and marketing company. The company's three largest revenue streams came from events, digital and marketing services. Although Penton had a long history (see below) as a trade publisher, in 2015 it reported that 35% of its EBITDA derived from digital products, 54% from events, and 11% from print. The main industry segments served by Penton include agriculture, transportation, natural products/food, infrastructure, and design and manufacturing.

The company was descended from Penton Publishing, founded by John Penton in Cleveland in 1904 to bring together production of several trade magazine titles, including Foundry, which he had created in Detroit in 1892. However, after the Penton/Prism merger, the company is now headquartered in New York City, although it continues to maintain offices in Cleveland and other U.S. cities, with an employee base of approximately 1,350 people.

Due to reduced advertising sales as customers shifted to digital media from print, Penton went through "pre-packaged" bankruptcy reorganization in 2010.

On September 15, 2016, it was announced that Penton was to be bought by UK based company Informa for $1.56 billion. The sale closed on November 2, 2016. Penton was integrated into Informa Business Intelligence in 2017.

== Early history ==
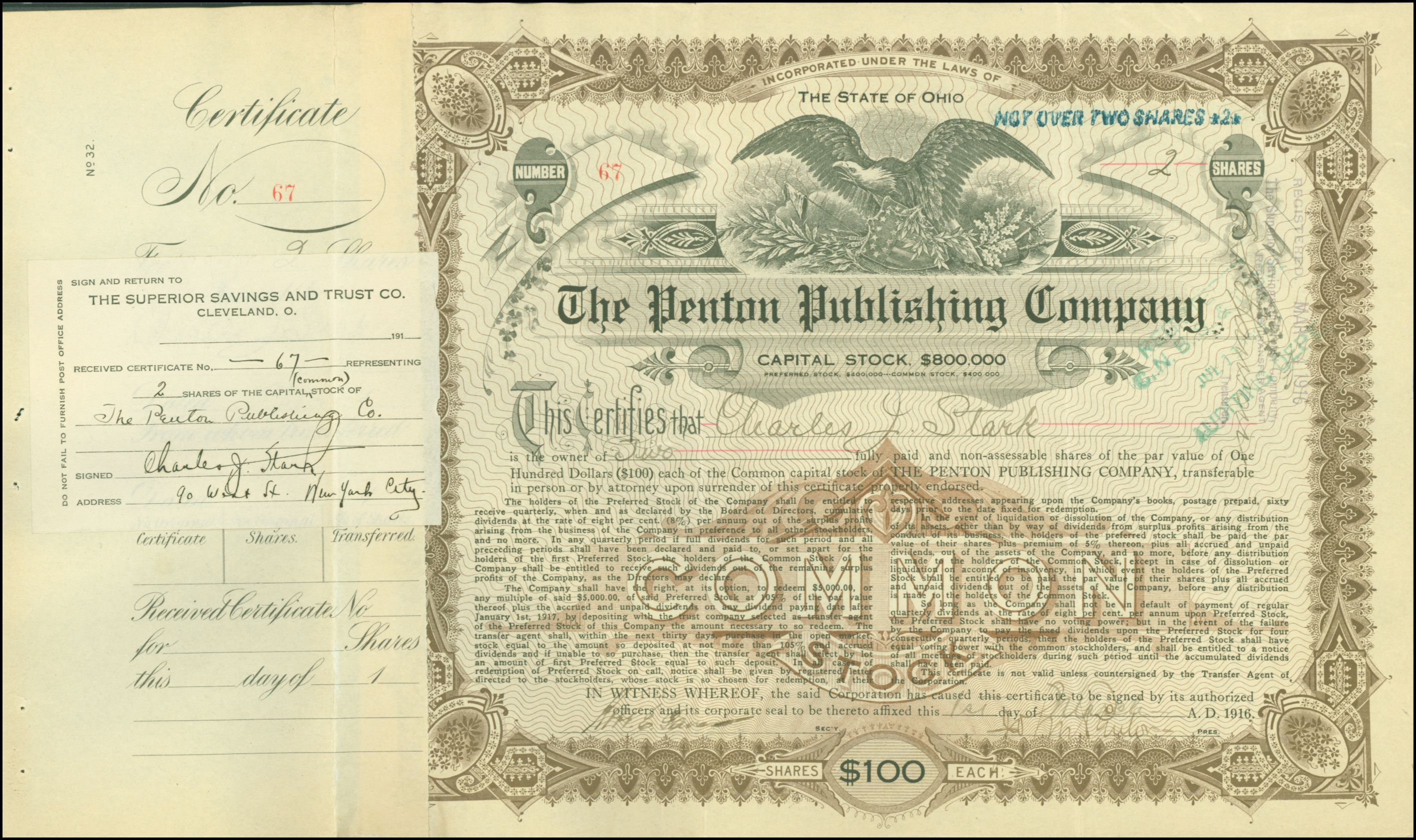
Share of the Penton Publishing Company, issued 1916

Penton's history began with two Cleveland companies, Penton Publishing Co., founded by John A. Penton—an iron molder by trade—in 1904, and the Industrial Publishing Co. John Penton had been involved in publishing trade magazines since 1887, creating Foundry in Detroit (1892), and then the Iron and Steel Press Co in Cleveland (1901). In Cleveland, he also published The Iron Trade Review, which became IndustryWeek.

By the 1920s, the company was a large business magazine publisher, for several years printing "Time" under contract. Between 1938 and 1945, Penton helped the United States Census establish the Standard Industrial Classification system, a digital coding system for industries.

Penton was owned by Pittway from 1976 to 1998.

== Content ==
Penton's global headquarters was in the Penton Media Building in Downtown Cleveland, Ohio from 2000 to 2006.

Numerous corporate acquisitions, sales, and mergers have occurred over the years. Wasserstein & Co. purchased Prism Business Media from Primedia (now Rent Group) in August 2005 for $385 million. Prism Business Media was then merged when Wasserstein purchased Penton Media in November 2006 for $194 million. The combined entity took the Penton Media name, later dropping the "Media" part. After the merger, Penton became one of the largest B2B media companies in the world.

In late 2010, Penton acquired Nation's Restaurant News. In early 2011, Penton sold Mix, Electronic Musician, Radio, and Sound & Video Contractor magazines to NewBay Media.

Also in 2011, Penton acquired EyeTraffic Media, an online marketing firm. This was Penton's first marketing services acquisition. Also in 2011, Penton acquired Nine Lives Media, an IT publisher with industry-related blogs. In 2012, Penton acquired Highline LP of the United Kingdom, adding to its digital aviation business. and Penton acquired Farm Progress from Fairfax Media Limited of Sydney, Australia, expanded its agriculture sector becoming the lead in agriculture information and marketing solutions.

Additionally in 2012, Penton's Technology Media Group went all digital. In the same year, David Kieselstein became CEO and was tasked with broadening Penton's digital solutions, entering new industry sectors, and exploring growth markets.

In April 2013, Penton acquired myITforum.com, an online community for Microsoft Management professionals. In the same month, Penton published the final issue of California Farmer, California's oldest farm magazine. Stating that the magazine wasn't as profitable as its other publications, Penton merged it with another property, Western Farm Press.

In August 2013, Penton acquired Aviation Week from McGraw Hill Financial. In October 2013, Penton announced that Broadcast Engineering magazine would cease publication after 54 years. In January 2015, Penton acquired iNET Interactive, a Cincinnati-based event and digital information company, focused on the cloud computing, hosting and data center segments.

Subsequent acquisitions include World Tea Media (producer of the World Tea Expo), MRO Network (an online media outlet for the global aviation maintenance, repair, and operations community), and TU-Automotive (an automotive technology hub).

== Data solutions ==
Despite its long history as a trade publisher, in March 2014 Penton moved towards monetizing its large (then 16 million records) database to support marketing campaigns. In order to do so, it created the Penton SmartReach division to sell subscriber data directly rather than through third-party list vendors. As of 2016, the database had grown to some 20 million records.

Penton analyses publicly available data for customers in industry sectors including agriculture, transportation, food, design and manufacturing, and infrastructure. One of Penton's data tools, NEXT Trend, for example, provided analysis for the natural products and food industry. In 2014, it predicted 50 percent growth by 2018 in the healthy, organic, and natural products market. NEXT Trend also makes data-based predictions about the market for specific ingredients, such as chia.

NEXT Accelerator is an online community for natural product entrepreneurs. It has been described as "an online portal open to anyone building a natural products startup...with video content and reading materials, worksheets, legal templates and regulatory documents and supplier and vendor information that can help young companies start and grow." Members also have access to a vetted list of service providers such as packaging vendors, branding consultants, and attorneys with relevant experience.

Govalytics captures and analyzes data generated by U.S. city and county governments for vendors marketing to municipalities. The company plans to expand coverage to the top 100 metropolitan statistical areas.

== Events ==
In addition to trade publishing and data solutions, Penton runs an events portfolio based on some of its media offerings, serving vendors and customers in the aviation, agriculture, and natural products segments. These include a series of Aviation Week MRO conferences,; the Farm Progress show; and the Natural Products Expos.
