= Bass Player (magazine) =

US monthly magazine for bassists

- Cover of the final issue (October 2022)
- Editor: Joel McIver
- Frequency: Every four weeks
- Founded: 1988
- Final issue: October 2022
- Company: Future US
- Country: United States
- Based in: New York City
- Language: English
- Website: Official website
- ISSN: 1050-785X

Bass Player was a magazine for bassists. Each issue offered a variety of artist interviews, lessons, and equipment reviews. The magazine was founded in 1988 as a spinoff of Guitar Player magazine, with Jim Roberts as its first editor. The original headquarters was in San Francisco, CA. It began as a regular edition magazine in 1990.

The magazine was published by Future US, Bass Player held an annual event for bassists, Bass Player LIVE!. From 2004 until 2007 Bass Player LIVE! was held in New York City; from 2008 until 2017 it was held in Hollywood, California.

The magazine ceased publication of print issue after October 2022 issue and became online-only.

== Editors ==
- Jim Roberts, March 1990 to December 1996
- Karl Coryat, January 1997 to January 1998
- Richard Johnston, February 1998 to July 2001
- Bill Leigh, August 2001 to March 2009
- Jonathan Herrera, April 2009 to December 2010
- Brian Fox, January 2011 to June 2014
- Chris Jisi, July 2014 to October 2018
- Joel McIver, November 2018 to October 2022

== Lifetime Achievement Awards ==
In most years since 1998, Bass Player has awarded Lifetime Achievement Awards to notable bassists, as follows:

- 1998 Milt Hinton, Bobby Rodriguez
- 1999 Chuck Rainey
- 2000 Joe Osborn, Percy Heath
- 2001 Jerry Jemmott, Leo Fender
- 2002 [no award]
- 2003 [no award]
- 2004 Anthony Jackson, Will Lee
- 2005 Ron Carter, Jack Bruce
- 2006 Stanley Clarke
- 2007 Lee Sklar, Tony Levin
- 2008 Carol Kaye, Verdine White, Mike Watt
- 2009 Rocco Prestia, Charlie Haden
- 2010 Bootsy Collins, Alphonso Johnson
- 2011 Jack Casady, James Jamerson, Larry Graham
- 2012 Chris Squire, Aston Barrett, Jaco Pastorius
- 2013 Geezer Butler, Lee Rocker
- 2014 Abe Laboriel, Sr
- 2015 Lemmy, Nathan East, Louis Johnson
- 2016 Billy Sheehan, George Porter Jr, Tim Bogert
- 2017 Flea, Jimmy Johnson, Donald "Duck" Dunn
- 2018 [no award]
- 2019 John Patitucci
- 2020 [no award]
- 2021 Marcus Miller, Gail Ann Dorsey, John Taylor, Charles Berthoud
