= Maintenance engineering =

Engineering discipline

Maintenance Engineering is the discipline and profession of applying engineering concepts for the optimization of equipment, procedures, and departmental budgets to achieve better maintainability, reliability, and availability of equipment.

Maintenance, and hence maintenance engineering, is increasing in importance due to rising amounts of equipment, systems, machineries and infrastructure. Since the Industrial Revolution, devices, equipment, machinery and structures have grown increasingly complex, requiring a host of personnel, vocations and related systems needed to maintain them. Prior to 2006, the United States spent approximately US$300 billion annually on plant maintenance and operations alone. Maintenance is to ensure a unit is fit for purpose, with maximum availability at minimum costs. A person practicing maintenance engineering is known as a maintenance engineer.

== Maintenance engineer's description ==
A maintenance engineer should possess significant knowledge of statistics, probability, and logistics, and in the fundamentals of the operation of the equipment and machinery he or she is responsible for. A maintenance engineer should also possess high interpersonal, communication, and management skills, as well as the ability to make decisions quickly.

Typical responsibilities include:

- Ensure optimization of the maintenance organization structure
- Analysis of repetitive equipment failures
- Estimation of maintenance costs and evaluation of alternatives
- Forecasting of spare parts
- Assessing the needs for equipment replacements and establish replacement programs when due
- Application of scheduling and project management principles to replacement programs
- Assessing required maintenance tools and skills required for efficient maintenance of equipment
- Assessing required skills for maintenance personnel
- Reviewing personnel transfers to and from maintenance organizations
- Assessing and reporting safety hazards associated with maintenance of equipment

== Maintenance engineering education ==
Institutions across the world have recognised the need for maintenance engineering. Maintenance engineers usually hold a degree in mechanical engineering, industrial engineering, or other engineering disciplines. In recent years specialised bachelor and master courses have developed. The bachelor degree program in maintenance engineering at the German-Jordanian University in Amman is addressing the need, as well as the master's program in maintenance engineering at Luleå University of Technology. With an increased demand for Chartered Engineers, The University of Lancashire in United Kingdom has developed a MSc in maintenance engineering currently under accreditation with the Institution of Engineering and Technology (IET) and a top-up Bachelor of Engineering with honour degree for technicians holding a Higher National Diploma (Also accredited by the IET) and seeking a progression in their professional career.

== See also ==
- Aircraft maintenance engineering
- Asset management
- Auto mechanic
- Civil engineer
- Computerized maintenance management system
- Computer repair technician
- Electrician
- Electrical Technologist
- Industrial Engineering
- Marine fuel management
- Mechanic
- Millwright (machinery maintenance)
- Maintenance, repair and operations (MRO)
- Reliability centered maintenance (RCM)
- Reliability engineering
- Preventive maintenance
- Product lifecycle management
- Stationary engineer
- Total productive maintenance (TPM)
- Six Sigma for maintenance

Associations

- INFORMS
- Institute of Industrial Engineers
