= Daily Radar =

American website portal (1999–2001)

Daily Radar was a news aggregator and portal site for Future US's male-oriented content, including sports, film and television, and video games. Launched in October 1999, Daily Radar started as a gaming website like IGN, GameSpy and GameSpot, and was later renamed and relaunched in the UK as GamesRadar. The site was run by Imagine Media (now Future) and consisted of many editors that contributed to Imagine's print publications. A victim of the dot-com bubble burst, Imagine closed Daily Radar in 2001, weeks shy of E3. The Washington Post later noted that Daily Radar was among multiple "popular video-game news sites" to close in 2001, alongside CNET Gamecenter.

== Popular culture ==
Its name has since been the inspiration for the name of a satirical website, The Daily Raider. It has also been the subject of jokes in the webcomic Penny Arcade.

The website was mentioned on a June 2001 episode of Whose Line is it Anyway?, when one of the reviewers employed by the website was sung to by Wayne Brady in the style of Britney Spears.

== Nintendo lawsuit and closure ==
Daily Radar was the center of a lawsuit brought against its parent company, Imagine Media by Nintendo. Nintendo alleged that Daily Radar used Pokémon images and the name "Pokémon" in their publication "100% Unofficial Pokémon Trainer's Guide". In response, Daily Radar ceased all reporting on Nintendo in January 2001. Four months later, on May 1, 2001, Imagine Media shut down Daily Radar.

On August 23, 2010, Daily Radar's website and all sub-sites (BallHype, ShowHype and several Daily Radar Blips sites) were replaced with a notice that they were "no longer being supported." As of September 2024, URLs for Daily Radar redirect to TechRadar, a website owned by Daily Radar's former owner, Future plc.
