= TV Tech =

American television trade magazine

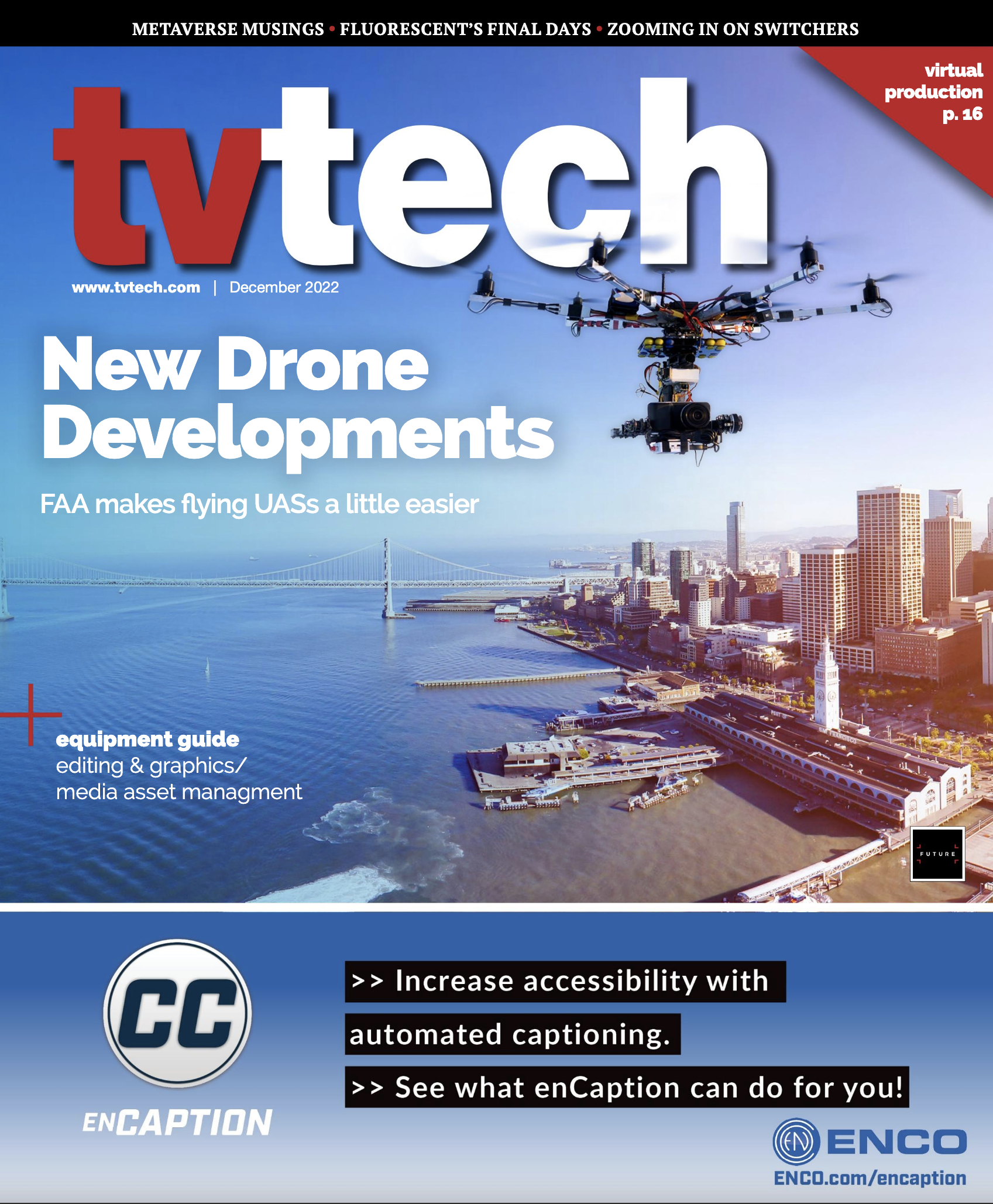
- Cover of December 2022 issue
- Editor-in-Chief: Tom Butts
- Categories: Trade magazine
- Frequency: Monthly
- Circulation: 35,000
- Company: Future US
- Country: United States
- Based in: New York, NY
- Language: English
- Website: www.tvtechnology.com
- ISSN: 0887-1701

TV Tech is a trade journal covering the English-speaking broadcast television industry in North America. The magazine is published monthly by Future US.

== History and profile ==
TV Tech is based in New York, NY. It covers television industry news focusing primarily on new technology, FCC and regulatory issues, mobile production, sports production and newsgathering as well as studio based production. Regulatory changes such as spectrum auctions, and the transitions to IP and the cloud as well as the transition to NextGen TV (ATSC 3.0) are also regularly covered.

Sister trade publications include TVBEurope, Radio World and Radio World Engineering Extra. TV Tech was founded in 1983 by IMAS Publishing and was privately held until IMAS was acquired by NewBay Media in 2007. Future plc acquired NewBay in April 2018.

In 2014, the magazine's owner, NewBay Media incorporated online content from Broadcast Engineering and Broadcast Engineering World to its website. In 2015, TV Technology changed to a monthly publishing schedule. In 2018, Future acquired NewBay Media.

In 2021, TV Technology changed its name to TV Tech.
