= Operations engineering =

Operations engineering is a branch of engineering that is mainly concerned with the analysis and optimization of operational problems using scientific and mathematical methods. More frequently it has applications in the areas of Broadcasting/Industrial Engineering and also in the Creative and Technology Industries.

Operations engineering is considered to be a subdiscipline of Operations Research and Operations Management.

== Associations ==
- INFORMS
- Society of Operations Engineers
- industrial operation

== See also ==
- Operations research
- Systems engineering
- Enterprise engineering
- Engineering management
- Business engineering
