= Future US =

American media company, founded 1994

Future US, Inc.
- Type: Subsidiary
- Industry: Publishing
- Predecessor: Imagine Media; GP Publications
- Founded: 1994; 32 years ago
- Headquarters: New York City, U.S.
- Key people: Rachelle Considine (CEO)
- Parent: Future plc

Future US, Inc. (formerly known as Imagine Media and The Future Network USA) is an American media corporation specializing in targeted magazines and websites in the video games, music, and technology markets. Headquartered in New York City, the corporation has offices in: Alexandria, Virginia; Minneapolis, Minnesota; and Washington, D.C. Future US is owned by parent company, Future plc, a specialist media company based in Bath, Somerset, England.

== History ==
The company was established when Future plc acquired struggling Greensboro (North Carolina) video game magazine publisher GP Publications, publisher of Game Players magazine, in 1994.

The company launched a number of titles including PC Gamer, and relocated from North Carolina to the San Francisco Bay Area, occupying various properties in Burlingame and South San Francisco. When Chris Anderson, the founder of Future plc, sold Future to Pearson plc he retained GP, renamed Imagine Media, Inc. in June 1995, and operated it as his sole company for a few years.

In 2001, the company closed 20 magazines (six in the US, six in the UK and eight in France and Germany) and five websites. More than 17 percent of its work force, 350 employees, were laid off.

Buoyed by the Internet economy and the success of Business 2.0 in the US (and subsequently in the UK, France, Italy and Germany), Future rode the boom of the late nineties. During this period the company won the exclusive worldwide rights to produce the official magazine for Microsoft's Xbox video game console and cemented its position as a leader in the games market. In the spring of 2001, buffeted by economic factors and the market downturn, Future Network USA went through a strategic reset of its business that included the closure of some titles and Internet operations and the sale of Business 2.0 to AOL/Time Warner.

On September 19, 2007, Nintendo and Future announced that Future US would obtain the publishing rights to Nintendo Power magazine. This came into effect with the creation of issue #222 (December 2007).

On October 1, 2007, it was announced that Future US would be making PlayStation: The Official Magazine, which ended up replacing PSM and first hit newsstands in November 2007. With this launch, Future US became the publisher of the official magazines of all three major console manufacturers in the US.

In February 2008, Future US invested in video game news aggregator N4G (owned by Vegard and Håvard Aure).

In 2012, NewBay Media bought the Music division of Future US. PlayStation: The Official Magazine closed that year.

In 2018, Future reacquired majority of the assets previously sold to NewBay by buying NewBay outright for US$13.8 million. Future used this acquisition to expand its US footprint, particularly in B2B segment.

In May 2021, Future US acquired the rights to Marie Claire from Hearst Communications. Parent company Future plc already owned the rights to Marie Claire in the UK after its acquisition of TI Media in 2020.

In August 2024, Future US announced it would be closing Broadcasting & Cable and Multichannel News on September 30, 2024.

== Magazines and websites ==
=== Current titles ===
Its magazines and websites include:

- GamesRadar+
- Guitar World
- MusicRadar
- Laptop Mag
- Live Science
- MacLife
- Marie Claire
- Newsarama
- PC Gamer
- SmartBrief
- FutureMusic
- Space.com
- TechRadar
- The Week
- Tom's Hardware
- TV Tech
- TWICE
- US Telecom Daily
- Who What Wear
- 5Gradar

=== Defunct titles ===
- AnandTech
- Bass Player
- CD-ROM Today
- Broadcasting & Cable
- Daily Radar
- Decorating Spaces
- Do!
- Electronic Musician
- Future Snowboarding Magazine
- Game Players
- Guitar One
- Guitar Player
- Guitar World Acoustic
- Guitar World Legends
- Guitar World's Bass Guitar
- iMore
- Maximum Linux
- Maximum PC
- Men's Edge
- Mobile PC (magazine)
- Multichannel News
- netPOWER
- Next Generation Magazine
- Nintendo Power
- Official Dreamcast Magazine
- Official Xbox Magazine
- PC Accelerator
- PlayStation: The Official Magazine
- Pocket Gamer (Note: not to be confused with Pocket Gamer by Steel Media)
- Revolution
- Scrapbook Answers
- Skateboard Trade News
- Snowboard Trade News
- T3
- The Net
- Total Movie
- Women's Health & Fitness
- World of Warcraft Official Magazine
