= Television crew =

People who produce television programming

Television crew positions are derived from those of film crew, but with several differences.

== Pre-production ==
Work before shooting begins is called the pre-production stage. The crew in this stage include the casting director, costume designer, director, location manager, make-up artist, researcher, screenwriter, set designer, and television producer.

=== Casting director ===
The casting director casts actors, and so is usually one of the first crew members on the project. In fact, during the initial casting call, the executive producer and casting director are often the only crew members.

=== Costume designer ===
The costume designer makes all the clothing and costumes worn by all the Actors on screen, as well as designing, planning, and organizing the construction of the garments down to the fabric, colours, and sizes. They greatly contribute to the appearance of the production, and set a particular mood, time, feeling, or genre. They alter the overall appearance of a project with their designs and constructions, including impacting on the style of the project, and how the audience interprets the show's characters.

=== Director ===
The television director is usually responsible for directing the actors and other filmed aspects of a television production. The role differs from that of a film director because the major creative control usually belongs to the producer. In general, actors and other regular artists on a show are familiar enough with their roles that the director's input is confined to technical issues. The director is responsible for all creative aspects of a production. The director typically helps hire the cast (and possibly crew). The director helps decide on locations, and creates a shooting plan. During shooting, the director supervises the overall project, manages shots, and keeps the assignment on budget and schedule. Though directors hold much power, they are second in command after the producer. The producer usually hires the director (unless the director is also the producer). Some directors produce their own television programs, and, with formal approval of the funding studio, enjoy a tighter grip on what makes the final cut than Directors usually have.

- Associate director (AD)

An associate director (AD) in television production is usually responsible for floor directing in the studio and ensuring that the sets, props and technical equipment are safe, ready to use and positioned correctly before filming. Associate directors are also responsible for communications with the audience and any guests, for example ensuring they are seated in good time, and assisting the Director with production. In scripted television series, an associate director occasionally serves as an episode's director, in which case someone else substitutes for the AD. Until the mid-2000s in the United States, associate directors were usually credited as technical coordinators, for most sitcoms were shot on film. Drama programs don't usually use ADs.

=== Location manager ===
The location manager finds and manages film locations. Most pictures are shot in the controllable environment of a studio sound stage but occasionally, outdoor sequences call for filming on location.

=== Make-up artist ===
A professional make-up artist is usually a cosmetology beautician, and applies makeup to anyone who appears on screen. They concentrate on the area above the chest, the face, the top of the head, the fingers, hands, arms, and elbows. Their role is to manipulate the actor's on-screen appearance to make them look younger, older, larger, etc.
Body make-up artists concentrate on the body rather than the head. Make-up itself is substances to enhance the beauty of the human body, but can also change the appearance, disguise, or costume someone. Make-up artists, hair stylists, costume designers, and dress technicians combine their efforts to transform actors into characters, presenters, etc.

=== Production designer ===
The production designer is responsible for the production's visual appearance. They design, plan, organize, and arrange set design, equipment availability, and control a production's on-screen appearance. The production designer is often called the set designer, or scenic designer. They are trained professionals, often with Master of Fine Arts (MFA) degrees in scenic design. The set designer collaborates with the theater director to create an environment for the production—and communicates details of this environment to the technical director, charge scenic artist and property master. Scenic designers create drawings and scale models of the scenery. The set designer also takes instructions from the art director to create the appearance of the stage, and design its technical assembly. The art director, who may also be the production designer, plans and oversees the formation of settings for a project. They must be well versed in art and design styles, including architecture and interior design. They also work with the Cinematographer to accomplish the precise appearance for the project.

=== Researcher ===
Researchers research the project ahead of shooting time to increase truth, factual content, creative content, original ideas, background information, and sometimes performs minor searches such as flight details, location conditions, accommodation details, etc. They inform the director, producer, and writer of factual information—technical, cultural, historical, etc.—that relates to events that the production portrays.

=== Set designer ===
The scenic designer collaborates with the theatre director and other members of the production design team to create an environment for the production, and then communicates details of this environment to the technical director, production manager, charge artist, and property master. Scenic designers create scale models of the scenery, artistic renderings, paint elevations, and scale construction drawings to communicate with other production staff.

=== Television producer ===
In the entertainment industry, a television producer (compare to film producer) is generally in charge of, or helps coordinate, the financial, legal, administrative, technological, and business aspects of a production. In television, a television producer can be given one of the following titles:

- Associate producer

The associate producer performs limited producing functions under the authority of a producer; often in charge of the day-to-day running of a production. Usually the producer's head assistant, although the task can differ. They frequently form a connection between everyone involved in shooting (the production team) and the people involved after filming to finalize the production, and get it publicized (the post-production team). Occasionally, credit for this role goes to the product's financial backer, or the person who originally brought the assignment to the producer.

- Assistant producer (AP)

In the UK, assistant producer is the closest role to that of a film director. An assistant producer often doubles as an experienced researcher, and takes direct charge of the creative content and action within a programme. The title of television director is usually reserved for dramatic programming, productions and most similar to films, or those who control a multi-camera set up from the gallery.

- Co-producer

Typically performs producing functions in tandem with one or more other co-producers (working as a team, rather than separately on different aspects of the production).

- Coordinating producer

The coordinating producer coordinates the work of two or more producers working separately on one or more productions.

- Executive producer

The executive producer supervises one or more producers in all aspects of their work, and sometimes initiated the production. They are usually the ultimate authority on creative and business aspects of the production. If the title is designated correctly, the executive producer arranges the project's financial backing and maintains a sound production budget. On scripted programs, the showrunner receives an executive producer credit.

- Line producer

A line producer supervises physical aspects of the production (not the creative aspects), including personnel, technology, budget, and scheduling. The line producer oversees the budget. This involves operating costs such as salaries, production costs, and everyday equipment rental costs. The Line Producer works with the Production manager on costs and expenditure.

- Segment producer

Produces one or more components of a multipart production.

- Supervising producer

Supervises one or more producers in some or all aspects of their work; usually works under the authority of an executive producer.

Additionally, more senior members of a television show's writing staff are credited as producers, with the specific title dependent upon the seniority and rate of pay for the writer. For example, a writer credited as a "co-executive producer" will typically receive a higher salary and be considered more senior than a writer credited as a "producer", who will in turn be higher "ranking" than a writer credited as "co-producer."

=== Writer ===
The Writer creates and moulds an original story, or adapts other written, told, or acted stories for production of a television show. Their finished work is called a script. A script may also have been a contribution of many writers, so it is the Writers Guild of America's (WGA) task to designate who gets the credit as 'the Writer'. 'Written by' in the credits, is a Writers Guild of America assigned terminology that means, "Original Story and Screenplay By." A screenplay or script is a blueprint for producing a motion picture, and a teleplay is the same thing for a television show. Writers can also come under the category of screenwriters. Screenwriters (also called script writers), are authors who write screenplays for productions. Many also work as script doctors, changing scripts to suit directors or studios. Script-doctoring can be lucrative, especially for better known writers. Most professional screenwriters are unionized, and are represented by organizations such as the WGA.

=== Head writer ===
A head writer oversees the writing team on a television or radio series. The title is common in the soap opera genre, and in sketch comedies and talk shows that feature monologues and comedy skits. In prime time series, an executive producer fills this function.

=== Screenwriter ===
Screenwriters or scenarists or scriptwriters create short or feature-length screenplays for films and television programs.

- Script editor

=== Story editor ===
Story editor is a job title in motion picture filmmaking and television production, also sometimes called supervising producer. A story editor is a member of the screenwriting staff who edits stories for screenplays.

== Production ==
Everything that happens as part of shooting the film is part of the production stage. The crew in this stage include the cinematographer, production manager, technical director, boom operator, gaffer, dolly grip, key grip, and stunt coordinator.

=== A1 ===
In television and live event production, the A1 is the primary audio engineer responsible for the technical design and operation of associated sound systems (e.g. mixers, microphones, intercom, IFB, RF equipment, PA/monitoring, music/sfx playback, multi-track recording, and more). Generally speaking, the A1 supervises all audio crew members during build, rehearsal, and show phases of any production. Ultimately, the A1 will have routed, recorded, and mixed all sound sources heard during the program broadcast.

=== A2 ===
The A2 helps get microphones or other audio devices to the right place or to the right person

An audio assistant (A2) positions and interconnects audio devices, such as microphones and intercoms, from the television production truck to the venue. Typically, larger productions use two or more A2s.

=== Boom operator ===
The boom operator is part of the sound crew, and an assistant to the sound engineer or production sound mixer. The boom operator's main responsibility is microphone placement, sometimes using a "fishpole" with a microphone attached to the end—and sometimes using a "boom" (most often a "fisher boom"). The fisher boom is a piece of equipment that the operator stands on that lets him precisely control the microphone at a greater distance from the actors. They also place wireless microphones on actors when necessary. The boom operator strives to keep the microphone boom near the action, but away from the camera frame so it never appears onscreen. They work closely with the production sound mixer, or sound recordist, to record all sound while filming including background noises, dialogue, sound effects, and silence.

=== Camera operator/cinematographer/videographer ===
As the head member of the camera crew, the camera operator uses the camera as instructed by the Director. They ensure the required action is correctly filmed in the frame, and must react instinctively as the proceedings take place. If the camera operator is also a cinematographer, they also help establish the theme and appearance of the show. The cinematographer—or director of photography (DP)—regulates lighting for every scene, frames some shots, chooses lenses, decides on film stock, and strives to match the project's visual appearance to the director's vision. However, the cinematographer does not usually move the camera on the set, as this is usually the exclusive role of a camera operator.

=== Character generator operator/aston/duet operator ===
The character generator (CG) Operator prepares and displays digital on-screen graphics (DOG or BUG) and lower third graphics on the character generator that were created by the broadcast designer.

=== Floor manager ===
The floor manager represents the director on the studio floor, and gives instructions and direction to crew, cast, and guests. It is closest to the role of an assistant director, as the job frequently entails barking orders to keep a production on schedule. The floor manager is always in direct contact with the director via talkback in the gallery. The floor manager also checks that the floor is clear and safe for the performance, checks that scenery and set pieces are ready, turns on appropriate lights, makes announcements to staff and audience, helps maintain quietness and order, calls cues, and prompts talents as required. They also provide cues, timing and other information to the presenters and talents.

- Assistant floor manager

An assistant floor manager (AFM) sets the stage, prompts contributors on the studio floor, and ensures that everyone knows their place in the script. This frees the floor manager for other duties. They often oversee a team of runners. Increasingly, assistant floor managers are asked to help design and prepare props, and help set and reset action on the studio floor.

=== Graphics coordinator ===
The graphics coordinator (GC) decides what graphic content should be displayed on-air—such as on a fullpage (a full-screen graphic) or a lower third (a bar graphic in the lower third of the screen). The GC should not be confused with the Duet operator, who usually operates the Duet and is part of a television crew, or a Broadcast designer who physically creates the graphics.

=== Stage manager ===
Stage managers organize and coordinate theatrical productions. The job encompasses a variety of activities, including organizing the production and coordinating communications between various personnel (e.g., between director and backstage crew, or actors and production management). Stage management is a sub-discipline of stagecraft.

=== Gaffer ===
The gaffer is the head electrician at the production set, and is in charge of lighting the stage under direction of the Cinematographer. In television, the term chief lighting director is often used instead of gaffer, and sometimes the technical director lights the set. The gaffer reports to the director of photography, lighting director. or lighting designer, and usually has an assistant called a best boy.

=== Grip ===
In the U.S. and Canada, grips are lighting and rigging technicians in the film and video industries. They constitute their own department on a film set and are directed by a key grip. Grips have two main functions. The first is to work closely with the camera department to provide camera support, especially if the camera is mounted to a dolly, crane, or in an unusual position, such as the top of a ladder. Some grips may specialize in operating camera dollies or camera cranes. The second main function of grips is to work closely with the electrical department to create lighting set-ups necessary for a shot under the direction of the director of photography.

- Key grip

The key grip is the head grip. Grips affect shadow effects with lights, and occasionally maneuver camera cranes, dollies, and platforms under direction from the Cinematographer. The term grip is used in slightly different ways in American and British or Australian film making. In the British and Australian film industries, a grip mounts and supports cameras, which can include anything beyond a basic tripod. Lighting in British and Australian film-making is headed by the gaffer, who is also part of the camera department. Grips can also be the people that do the laborious work on sets. These types of grips push, pull, roll, and lift various pieces of equipment under direction from a television director, television producer, or set designer.

- Dolly grip

In cinematography, the dolly grip places and moves the dolly track where required, and then pushes and pulls the dolly along that track during filming. A dolly grip works closely with the camera crew to perfect these complex movements through rehearsals. For moving shots, dolly grips may also push the wheeled platform that holds the microphone and Boom Operator. The dolly is a cart that the tripod and camera (and occasionally the camera crew) rest on. It transports the camera without bumps and visual interruptions throughout a shot. It is commonly used to follow beside an actor to give the audience the sense of walking with the actor, or as the actor.

=== Gallery/control room team ===
These crew positions are only used on a multiple-camera setup production. The gallery, or production control room, is a separate darkened area away from the studio floor, where the action can be viewed on multiple monitors and controlled from a single source.

=== Production manager ===
The production manager makes deals concerned with business about the crew, and organizes the technical needs of the production. This would involve many things ranging from gaining the correct equipment with the exact technical requirements; to arranging accommodation for the cast and crew. The production manager reports their expenses and needs to the Line Producer.

=== Production assistant ===
The production assistant (PA) occupies a prompting role in the Gallery or Control Room. They communicate with the broadcasting channel during a live television broadcast, counting down time-to-transmission aloud to the crew via the studio microphone. They also count down time remaining for sections of a programme, such as an interview or an advertising break. Prior to a production, the PA prepares and times the script, noting pre-recorded inserts, sound effects, etc.—and clears copyright and other administrative issues.

=== Runner ===
Runners are the most junior members of a television crew. They fetch and carry, and do most production odd jobs. They support anyone who needs help until they learn enough to assume more responsibility. In the United States, this position is sometimes called a gofer.

=== Stunt coordinator ===
Where the programme requires a stunt, and involves the use of stunt performers, the stunt coordinator arranges casting and performance for the stunt, working closely with the television director.

=== Technical director ===
In a production control room (PCR), the technical director (TD) has overall responsibility for the operation of the production. The technical director ensures that all equipment in the PCR operates correctly. They also match the quality and the output of all the cameras on the studio floor through the camera control units (CCU) (vision engineering). The TD supervises the other crew members in the PCR. The technical director also coordinates the working of the whole crew, and handles technical problem before, during, or after the shooting of a project.

=== Television director – director ===
Unlike the film counterpart, a director in television usually refers to the gallery (or control room) director, who is responsible for the creative look of a production through selecting which shots to use at any given moment. The director views the action on the studio floor through a bank of screens, each linked to one of the cameras, while issuing instructions down to the floor manager. They also control the gallery area, calling for sound rolls, digital on-screen graphics (Astons) and video rolls video tape recorder (VT's). Some directors also work more closely with on-camera talent and others also act as both producer and director.

=== Presentation officer/video control operator/vision engineering ===
A video control operator (typically credited as video control, and sometimes as a video engineer or video operator) controls the video console to regulate transmission of content—everything from test patterns to live and recorded telecasts. Video control operators view the action on set through video monitors and set switches and observe dials on the video console to control contrast, framing, brilliance, color balance, and the fidelity of the transmitted image. They monitor the program to ensure broadcast technical quality, and review the program to determine that the signal functions properly and is ready for transmission on schedule. Video control operators and video tape operators are used only in television productions recorded on video tape because of the growing use of broadcast automation with video servers.

=== Camera control unit operator ===
A Camera control unit operator (typically credited as CCU operator) controls the camera control unit, which is a series of camera remote controls for exposure, white balance, and contrast, to regulate the picture quality between multiple cameras.

=== Video tape operator ===
The video tape operator (VT operator or VTR operator) cues and prepares video inserts into a program. A VT operator sets up and operates video tape equipment to record and play back the program, reads the program log to ascertain when to record the program, and when it airs. They also select sources, such as satellite or studio, for the program, and select the video recording equipment to use. They are heavily used in sports programming, and in all video taped productions, including television news programming, and sometimes sitcoms, if they are shot on video tape), they are also responsible for action replays and quickly editing highlights while a show is in progress. As the title suggests, video tape operators only work in video taped production. Although, VTR operator's still work on digital productions. It is a name that has just stuck to the playback operator. They can also be on set editors to give the director and director of photography the ability to see how what they shot cuts together.

=== Vision mixer ===
The vision mixer, or technical director (TD) in the United States, switches between video sources—such as camera shots and video inserts. They also maintain colour and contrast balance between the studio cameras. The term vision mixer is also used to describe the equipment operated by the technical director/vision mixer person, which can be a source of confusion. In the United States, the equipment is called the video switcher or production switcher, so the confusion does not arise.

== Post-production ==
Everything after shooting of a film is post-production. People involved in this stage of production include the film editor for film editing, video editor for video editing, publicist for publicity, sound editor, Foley artist, composer, title sequence designer, and specialist editors.

=== Colorist ===
The colorist interprets the program's visual look, often supervised by post-production producers and the cinematographer. Digital tools in the color grading suite control brightness, contrast, color, and the general "mood" of each shot, usually in an effort to make a scene appear to flow naturally from one shot to the next.

=== Composer ===
A composer writes the music for a production. They may also conduct an orchestra, or part of an orchestra, that plays the music. The composer occasionally writes theme music for a television show. A television program's theme music is a melody closely associated with the show, usually played during the title sequence and end closing credits. If accompanied by lyrics, it is a theme song.

=== Editor ===
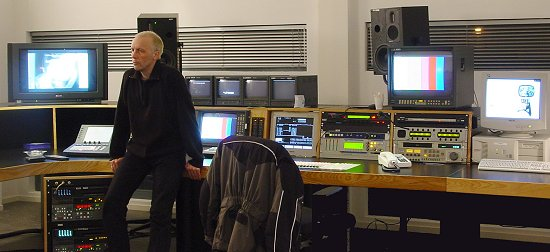
Editor in linear suite

The editor works in tandem with the director to edit raw footage into a finished work. The director has ultimate accountability for editing choices, but often the editor contributes substantially to the creative decisions concerned in piecing together a finalized product. Often the editor commences their role whilst filming is still in process, by compiling initial takes of footage. It is an extremely long process to edit a television show, demonstrating the importance, and significance editing has on a production. Gradually more editors work on non-linear editing systems (NLE), limiting physical touching of the actual film, decreasing film corruption due to touch.

The editor follows the screenplay as the guide for establishing the structure of the story, and assembles the various shots and takes for greater, clearer artistic effect. There are several editing stages. In the first stage, the editor is supervised by the director, who conveys their vision to the editor. So this first rough cut is created during offline editing. After the first stage, the following cuts may be supervised by one or more television producers, who represent the production company and its investors. Consequently, the final cut is the one that most closely represents what the studio wants from the film, and not necessarily what the director wants during online editing.

=== Foley artist ===
The Foley artist on a film crew creates and records many of the sound effects. Foley artists, editors, and supervisors are highly specialized and essential for producing a professional-sounding soundtrack – often reproducing commonplace yet essential sounds like footsteps or the rustle of clothing. The Foley artist also fabricates sounds that weren't correctly recorded while filming, much like the sound editor does with digital sound effects.

=== Post-production runner ===
A post-production runner, unlike a production runner, carries out tasks essential to the smooth running of a post-production house. Runners are the most junior members of a post-production team.

=== Publicist ===
A publicist, or advertiser has the task of raising public awareness of a production, and ultimately increase viewers and sales of it and its merchandise. The publicist's main task is to stimulate demand for a product through advertising and promotion. Advertisers use several recognizable techniques in order to better convince the public to buy a product. These may include:

- Repetition: Some advertisers concentrate on making sure their product is widely recognized. To that end, they simply attempt to make the name remembered through repetition.
- Bandwagon: By implying that the product is widely viewed, advertisers hope to convince potential buyers to "get on the bandwagon."
- Testimonials: Advertisers often attempt to promote the superior worth of their product through the testimony of ordinary users, experts, or both. For example, using film critics or media personalities. This approach often involves an appeal to authority such as a doctor of media science.
- Pressure: By attempting to make people choose quickly and without long consideration, some advertisers hope to make rapid sales, and a sense of urgency to watch or buy a product.
- Association: Advertisers often attempt to associate their product with desirable things, in order to make it seem equally desirable. The use of attractive models, picturesque landscapes, and other similar imagery is common. "Buzzwords" with desired associations are also used.
- Imagery: Using advertising slogans, logos, or a common image increases familiarity, trust, personality of a production, and the ability for the show to be remembered.

The publicist ensures the media are well aware of a project by distributing the show as a trial run or sneak preview. They issue press releases and arrange interviews with cast and crew members. They may arrange public visits to the set, or distribute media kits that contain pictures, posters, clips, shorts, trailers, and descriptions of the show.

=== Sound editor ===
In television, the sound editor deals with audio editing, adjusting and fixing of the soundtrack. They usually have a major decision-making and creative role when it comes to sound and audio. A sound editor also decides what sound effects to use and what effects to achieve from the sound effects, edits and makes new sounds using filters and combining sounds, shaping sound with volume curves, and equalizing. A sound editor places the Foley artist's sounds into the sound track. Often, a sound editor uses a sound effects library, either self-compiled, bought or both.

=== Title sequence designer ===
A title sequence, in a television program, appears at the beginning of the show and displays the show name and credits, usually including actors, producers and, directors. A montage of selected images and a theme song are often included to suggest the essential tone of the series. A title sequence is essential in preparing the audience for the following program, and gives them a sense of familiarity that makes them trust, and feel comfortable with the film. It is up to the title sequence designer to achieve this very goal, and make it catchy, entertaining.

== Specialist editors ==
=== ADR editor ===
Automatic dialogue replacement (ADR) is the process of replacing dialogue that was recorded incorrectly during filming, with the actors' voices recorded and put into place during editing. The ADR editor oversees the procedure and takes the corrupted dialogue, and replaces it with newly recorded lines to match the actor's mouth on film to make it lip sync correctly.

=== Bluescreen director/matte artist ===
Bluescreen is the film technique of shooting foreground action against a blue background, which is then replaced by a separately shot background plate scene by either optical effects or digital composting. This process is directed and co-ordinated by the bluescreen director. The matte artist is a part of the special effects department who assists in making scenery and locations that do not exist. They assemble backgrounds using traditional techniques or computers that mix with the footage filmed to create a false set. Both are fairly alike, but bluescreen technology is more modern and more widely used.

=== Visual effects artist ===
Visual effects artists (VFX) are used in television productions to create effects that cannot be achieved by normal means, such as depicting travel to other star systems. They are also used when creating the effect by normal means is prohibitively expensive, such as an enormous explosion. They are also used to enhance previously filmed elements, by adding, removing or enhancing objects within the scene. The visual effects artist creates these effects, and develops them with the help of the visual effects supervisor. The task of the Visual effects artist differs frequently, and can range from combining extensive over-the-top special effects with computer visual effects and CGI animation.

== See also ==
- List of motion picture-related topics
- Film crew
- Production team
