= Graphics coordinator =

A graphics coordinator (GC) or font assist is an individual who works, usually on a television show, as a producer of on-air still and motion graphics. The graphics coordinator decides what content should be displayed on-air — such as on a fullpage (a full-screen graphic) or a lower third (a bar graphic appearing in the lower third of the screen). The GC should not be confused with the Operator, who usually operates a character generator (CG) and is part of a television crew, or a broadcast designer who physically creates the graphics.

A CG (3D computer graphics) coordinator or supervisor plays an important role in film and television productions. Their role is to supervise, manage, and administer the computer-generated imagery (CGI) digital production computer animation workflow for the film or television show and attend client meetings and conference calls.

The CG supervisor generally is in charge or has a senior input regarding artist management and resource planning, and also plays a senior role in digital productions. While it is a creative role, most supervisors possess a strong technical background and are capable of making informed decisions about the most efficient and effective techniques to employ in order to solve the problem at hand. Often, a supervisor will work in tandem with a visual effects producer, VFX creative director and visual effects supervisor.

Specific responsibilities vary somewhat, depending on the nature of the production; however, most supervisors:

- Handle a CG project from conception through to completion;
- Manage and direct the technical, artistic, and production staff;
- Possess a knowledge of various computer graphic techniques, with emphasis on technical aspects, pipelines, and general film knowledge;
- Constantly improve workflow and artist training, with an eye on efficiency;
- Collaborate on the bidding and negotiation processes.

There is no union for CG supervisors; however, the Visual Effects Society is a prominent trade organization representing the interests of visual effects professionals.

== See also ==
- SIGGRAPH
- VFX Creative Director
- Cinefex Magazine
