= L bar =

L bar, or L-bar may refer to:

- L with bar (Ƚ, ƚ), Latin letter
- J-bar lift, type of ski and snowboarding lift
- A type of television news screen layout

LBAR may refer to:

- Limited area sine transform BARotropic, track model used by the Tropical cyclone forecast model
