= Character generation =

Character generation may refer to:

- Character creation, the process of creating a character for a role-playing game
- Character generator, a device or software that produces text for keying into a video stream
