= Acknowledgment (creative arts and sciences) =

Expression of gratitude for assistance in creating a work

King Solomon's Mines, H. Rider Haggard (1885)

In the creative arts and scientific literature, an acknowledgment (British English also acknowledgement) is an expression of a gratitude for assistance in creating an original work.

Receiving credit by way of acknowledgment rather than authorship indicates that the person or organization did not have a direct hand in producing the work in question, but may have contributed funding, criticism, or encouragement to the author(s). Various schemes exist for classifying acknowledgments; Cronin et al. give the following six categories:

1. moral support
2. financial support
3. editorial support
4. presentational support
5. instrumental/technical support
6. conceptual support, or peer interactive communication (PIC)

Apart from citation, which is not usually considered to be an acknowledgment, acknowledgment of conceptual support is widely considered to be the most important for identifying intellectual debt. Some acknowledgments of financial support, on the other hand, may simply be legal formalities imposed by the granting institution. Occasionally, bits of science humor can also be found in acknowledgments.

There have been some attempts to extract bibliometric indices from the acknowledgments section (also called "acknowledgments paratext") of research papers to evaluate the impact of the acknowledged individuals, sponsors and funding agencies.

== Spelling ==
The spelling acknowledgment is standard in American English and Canadian English. However, the spelling acknowledgement is used in British English, Australian English, and other English-speaking regions.

== Credit in the arts ==
In the creative arts, credits are an acknowledgment of those who participated in the production. They are often shown at the end of movies and on CD jackets. In film, video, television, theater, etc., credits means the list of actors and behind-the-scenes staff who contributed to the production.

=== Non-fiction ===
In non-fiction writing, especially academic works, it is generally considered important to give credit to sources of information and ideas. Failure to do so often gives rise to charges of plagiarism, and "piracy" of intellectual rights such as the right to receive a royalty for having written. In this sense the financial and individual meanings are linked.

Academic papers generally contain a lengthy section of footnotes or citations. Such detailed crediting of sources provides readers with an opportunity to discover more about the cited material. It also provides a check against misquotation, as it's easy for an attributed quote to be checked when the reference is available. All of this is thought to improve integrity of the instructional capital conveyed, which may be quite fragile, and easy to misinterpret or to misapply.

=== In fiction ===
In fiction writing, authors are generally expected to give credit to those who contributed significantly to a work. Sometimes authors who do not want credit for their work directly may choose to use a pen name. A ghostwriter gives all or some of the credit for his or her writing to someone else.

== In computing ==
In computer software licenses, attribution of credit is sometimes a condition of licensing. For example, original versions of the BSD license controversially required credit to be provided in the advertisement for software that used licensed code, but only if features or use of the licensed software was mentioned in the advertisement.

Software documentation is sometimes licensed under similar terms. For example, the GNU Free Documentation License (GFDL) used by Wikipedia requires that acknowledgments to authors be preserved.

== See also ==
- Acknowledgment index
- Billing (filmmaking)
- Byline
- Character generator
- Credits
- Digital on-screen graphic (BUG)
- Intellectual property
- Lower third
- Plagiarism
- Possessory credit
- Production logo
- Signature block
- Title sequence
- WGA screenwriting credit system
