= Credits =

List of people involved in the production of media

Credits are traditionally used in various forms of media to provide attribution to the people involved in producing it. It is commonly found in films, television programs, and video games. While opening credits will usually display only the major positions in a production's cast and crew (such as creators, producers, and lead actors), closing credits will typically acknowledge all staff members that were involved in the production.

== Opening credits ==
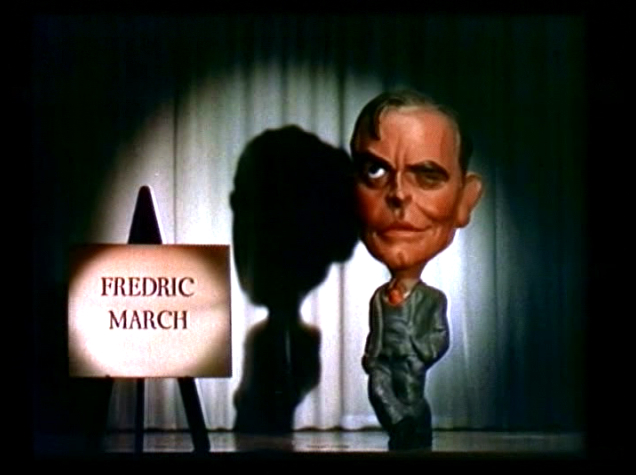
Screenshot of a figure representing Fredric March from the opening credits of the film Nothing Sacred

The opening credits, in a television program, motion picture, or video game, are shown at the beginning of a show or movie after the production logos and list the most important members of the production. They are usually shown as text. Some opening credits are built around animation or production numbers of some sort (such as the James Bond films). Opening credits mention the major actors; the lead actor is prominent, and the supporting actors follow. Others that are listed are guest stars, producers and director (also editor if a different person), as opposed to closing credits, which list the entire production crew.

In a motion picture, television program or video game, the opening credits or opening titles are shown at the very beginning and list the most important members of the production. They are now usually shown as text superimposed on a blank screen or static pictures, or sometimes on top of action in the show. There may or may not be accompanying music. When opening credits are built into a separate sequence of their own, the correct term is a title sequence (e.g., the familiar James Bond and The Pink Panther title sequences).

Opening credits since the early 1980s, if present at all, identify the major actors and crew, while the closing credits list an extensive cast and production crew. Historically, however, opening credits have been the only source of crew credits and, largely, the cast, although over time the tendency to repeat the cast, and perhaps add a few players, with their roles identified (as was not always the case in the opening credits), evolved. The ascendancy of television movies after 1964 and the increasingly short "shelf-life" of films in theaters has largely contributed to the credits convention which came with television programs from the beginning, of holding the vast majority of cast and crew information for display at the end of the show.

In movies and television, the title and opening credits may be preceded by a "cold open", or teaser (in other words, a brief scene prior to the main acts), that helps to set the stage for the episode or film.

=== History in cinema ===
Up until the 1970s, closing credits for films usually listed only a reprise of the cast members with their roles identified, or even simply just said "The End", requiring opening credits to normally contain the details. For instance, the title sequence of the 1968 film Oliver! runs for about three-and-a-half minutes, and while not listing the complete cast, does list nearly all of its technical credits at the beginning of the film, all set against a background of what appear to be, but in fact are not, authentic 19th-century engravings of typical London life. The only credit at film's end is a listing of most of the cast, including cast members not listed at the beginning. These are set against a replay of some of the "Consider Yourself" sequence.

Some opening credits are presented over the opening sequences of a film, rather than in a separate title sequence. The opening credits for the 1993 film The Fugitive continued intermittently over several opening scenes, and did not finish until fifteen minutes into the film. The opening credits for the 1968 film Once Upon a Time in the West lasted for fourteen minutes.

The first sound film to begin without any opening credits was Walt Disney's Fantasia, released in 1940. In the film's general release, a title card and the credit "Color by Technicolor" were spliced onto the beginning of the film, but otherwise there were no credits, although closing credits were added to the 1990 re-release and are on the videocassette. This general release version has been the one most often seen by audiences. In the roadshow version of the film, unseen by most audiences until its DVD release, the title card is seen only at the halfway point of the film, as a cue that the intermission is about to begin. The intermission was omitted in the general release version.

Orson Welles' Citizen Kane begins with only a title credit. This practice was extremely uncommon during that era.

West Side Story (1961) begins with a shot of an ink sketch of the New York City skyline. As the background of the shot changes color several times, we hear an overture medley (not in the original show) of some of the film's songs. As the overture ends, the camera pulls back and we see the title of the film. The rest of the credits are shown as graffiti at the end.

Most Disney films released between 1937 and 1981 had all the film-related information in the opening credits, while the closing consisted only of the credit "The End: A Walt Disney Production or Walt Disney Productions". 1964's Mary Poppins was the first Disney film to have longer closing credits, in which all the principal cast members (and the characters that they played) were listed.

Most Soviet films presented all film-related information in the opening credits, rather than at the closing which consisted of only a "THE END" (Russian: КОНЕЦ ФИЛЬМА, Konyets Fily-ma) title. A typical Soviet opening credits sequence starts with a film company's logo (such as Mosfilm or Lenfilm), the film's title, followed by the scenarist (the Soviet Union considered the scriptwriter the principal "auteur" of its films), followed by the director, usually on separate screens, then continuing with screens showing other credits, of varying number, and finally, the film's chief administrator-in-charge, the production director (Russian: Директор картины, Direktor kartiny). Following this came the cast, usually in actor-and-role format for all principal and major featured players, and perhaps then a screen only naming, in an alphabetical cluster, some additional character players. The final credit screen identified the studio corresponding to the logo at the beginning, and the year of the film's production. It could also contain the frame with the technical information about the cinematographic film manufacturer (e.g., Svema).

This basic method was also followed in most American films from the 1930s through the late 1980s. American films also tended to list the names of the actors before the names of the directors, screenwriters, and other principal crew members. Exceptions were made in the films of director Frank Capra, whose name was usually billed before the film's title. Director Victor Fleming's name was also billed before those of the actors in films such as The Wizard of Oz, Dr. Jekyll and Mr. Hyde and Joan of Arc. Capra, Fleming, and James Whale were some of the few directors who received the credit "A [director's name] Production" even though they did not produce their films.

François Truffaut's 1966 film Fahrenheit 451 uses spoken opening credits instead of written ones, in keeping with the film's story of a world without reading matter, as well as Jean-Luc Godard's Contempt of 1963.

George Lucas is credited with popularizing films without opening credits with his Star Wars films, which display only the film's title at the start followed by the films' signature opening crawl. His decision to omit opening credits in his films Star Wars (1977) and The Empire Strikes Back (1980) led him to resign from the Directors Guild of America after being fined $250,000 for not crediting the director during the opening title sequence. However, Hollywood had been releasing films without opening credits for many years before Lucas came along, most notably Citizen Kane, West Side Story, 2001: A Space Odyssey and The Godfather.

"Title-only" billing became an established form for summer blockbusters in 1989, with Ghostbusters II, Lethal Weapon 2 and The Abyss following the practice. Clint Eastwood has omitted opening credits (except for the title) in every film that he has directed since approximately 1982.

By the 2000s, many major American motion pictures had done away with opening credits, with many films, such as Van Helsing in 2004 and Batman Begins in 2005, not even displaying the film title until the closing credits begin. Yet, although minimalist (or absent) opening title sequences have become the norm in the 2000s, not all films have followed this trend, and many complex and creative examples can still be found. Among these, retro title sequences, which echo the styles of previous eras, have proved a popular design choice.

=== Credit only ===
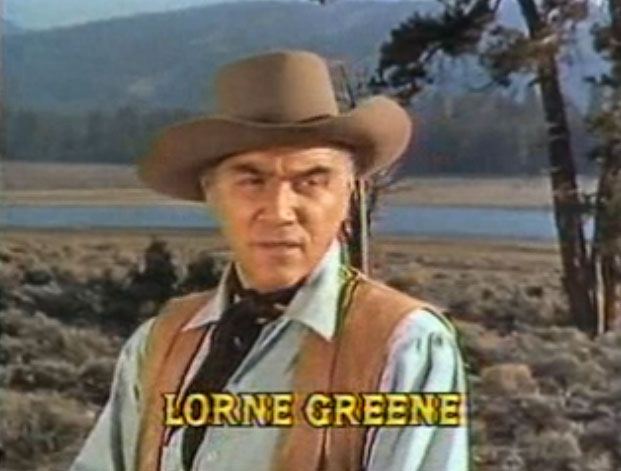
Regular cast member Lorne Greene in the opening credits to Bonanza

With regard to television series, it is now an accepted practice to credit regular cast members for every episode of a season, even if they did not appear in each episode. One example is the American television series Nip/Tuck, in which the appearance of all credited characters is rare. Another television series that credited all regulars for a season in every episode (regardless of whether or not they appeared) was Lost, most notably from season two onward, in which the complete credited cast appeared in only two episodes out of 23. During Lost's fourth season, Harold Perrineau was credited for all thirteen episodes, despite only having appeared in five of them (fewer than some guest stars, such as Jeff Fahey).

The series Charmed also began by crediting every regular cast member even if they did not appear in the episode. The season two episode "Morality Bites" is the only episode in which only the three leading actresses were credited, and later the male cast members were only credited in the episodes in which they appeared. If a regular actor was not featured in that particular episode, the opening credits were edited with their images omitted and the actors not being credited.

The television series Police Squad!, in keeping with its parodic nature, featured a character who only appeared in the credits ("...and Rex Hamilton as Abraham Lincoln").

=== Soap operas ===
Traditionally, actors in daytime soap operas are not credited in the episode opening sequences; this has been the case because of the escapist tone of the soap opera genre and as such, producers of soaps did not want cast members credited in the opening sequence in order to keep this intact. The drawback to this is that cast members are often identified by fans as their soap opera personas and not as themselves, as opposed to actors on other television programs who, in many cases, were identifiable by their own name.

In the 2000s, some soap operas began using an opening sequence where the actors are credited. The Young and the Restless was the first such show to credit, at least, most of the actors on contract with the series. The Bold and the Beautiful, which is produced by Bell-Phillip Television Productions (a subsidiary of Y&R producer Bell Dramatic Serial Company), began crediting all contract cast members in its opening titles in 2004, four years after The Young and the Restless implemented it (however, unlike Y&R, The Bold and the Beautiful cycles between different title sequences depending on the episode's running time: two that feature credits – including one shorter sequence – and one that does not feature any credits or cast member visuals). ABC Daytime soaps began implementing the process in October 2002 with the debut of the All My Children 'Scrapbook" opening used until May 2004. One Life to Live began featuring character credits within the title sequence during the same time period with its "Blue and White" opening. The most recent soap to include credits for all contract actors in its opening titles was General Hospital after a February 2010 revamp of its opening credits (a credit-less introduction resumed in 2012 with the introduction of a shorter title sequence), though during the final years of its "Faces of the Heart" sequence from April 2003 to September 2004, the names of the main characters were shown alongside video headshots of the cast members in the opening title sequence.

Often, only the Friday episode of a daytime serial would run closing credits listing the actors. All performers from the preceding five episodes would be listed. Starting in the 2000s, complete end credits began running more frequently. Days of Our Lives in particular currently credits all actors, those on contract, on recurring status and with guest starring roles on the show that week, alternating every other episode with a closing credit sequence showing the program's crew members; in either instance, either version is shown after the producer, director and writing credits (General Hospital, The Young and the Restless and The Bold and the Beautiful credit all performers during their closing credits, although the latter two only credit recurring and guest cast members are credited for their appearance that week only and General Hospital mainly credits only main and recurring cast members).

British soaps have never credited cast members or crew members in their opening titles nor do they show video or images of the cast members. However, in recent years these programmes have listed the writers, producers and directors over the first scene of the episode and episode titles if they apply. The opening titles of Hollyoaks feature regular characters in short (less than one second) scenes intended to capture their character.

=== Common order of credits ===
While there are numerous variations most opening credits use some variation of the basic order. In the absence of opening credits, these roles will often be credited in reverse order at the beginning of the closing credits.

- Name of the studio that is distributing the film and may or may not have produced it (for example, the major film studios like Walt Disney Pictures, Universal Pictures, or Warner Bros.)
- Name of the production company that actually made the film or name of the investment groups or companies that financed a substantial part of the film (usually credited as "in association with" or "A [production company name] production").
- The primary artistic credit for the film. Generally the film director, but sometimes the producer or writer. Normally stylized "A film by [name]" or "A [name] film". Sometimes placed before a title. (e.g., "Alfred Hitchcock's Psycho").
- Principal actors (sometimes the stars' and director's credits will be reversed, depending on the star's deal with the studio; in other cases, as in the Rodgers and Hammerstein films, or as in all three film versions of Show Boat, or, as in many Disney films, the title of the film will be shown before the names of the production company, its possessory credit, and its actors; sometimes, as in many of Cannon's films, the name(s) of the principal actor(s) will be shown before the name(s) of the producer(s), i.e. "The Cannon Group presents X in a Golan-Globus production of a Y film").
- Name of the film.
- Featured actors.

As a variation some of the below may be noted:

- Gowns (older movies)
- Sound recording (older movies)
- Casting director. Those who are members of the Casting Society of America will have the post-nominal letters "CSA" after their name.
- Composer of music
- VFX Studio
- Costume designer
- Film editor. Those who are members of the American Cinema Editors will have the post-nominal letters "ACE" after their name. Other professional bodies include South African Guild of Editors (SAGE).
- Production designer.
- Director of photography.

Members of the following societies will have post-nominal letters after their name:
- American Society of Cinematographers: ASC
- Australian Cinematographers Society: ACS
- British Society of Cinematographers: BSC
- Canadian Society of Cinematographers: CSC
- Asociacíon Mexicana de Cinematografia: AMC

- Producers, co-producers, executive producers, 'also produced by' (credited for various reasons according to contracts and personal scrutiny of the principal producer). Often, though, the name of the producer will be the second-to-last opening credit, just before the writer's name(s) are shown (Pursuant to WGA rules, writer credits are immediately adjacent to the Director.).

The opening credits of A Farewell to Arms, based on the 1929 semi-autobiographical novel by Ernest Hemingway.

Those who have been certified by the Producers Guild of America that they actually performed a major portion of the producing duties of the film will have the "Producers Mark" certification mark--the post-nominal letters "p.g.a."--after their names. (Note: The Producers Mark is certified on a per-film basis; certification is optional except for films developed and produced internally by the major film studios, in which, through collective bargaining agreements made between 2012 and 2013, the studios are required to submit all said films for Producers Mark certification.)

- Based on a book or other literary work.
- Based on characters from a book or other media.
- Person who wrote the story on which the script is based, gets "story by" credit, and the first screenplay credit, unless the script made substantial changes to the story.
- Screenplay writers. The Writers Guild of America allows only three writing credits on a feature film, although teams of two are credited as one, separated on the credits by an ampersand ("X & Y"). If each works independently on the script (the most common system), they are separated by an "and". If more than two persons worked on the screenplay, the credits may read something like "screenplay by X & Y and Z and W", meaning that X and Y worked as a team, but Z and W worked separately.
- Director. The Directors Guild of America usually permits a film to list only one director, even when it is known that two or more worked on it. Exceptions are made in rare cases such as a death and subsequent replacement of the director mid-production as well as for established directing teams such as the Coen brothers.

== Title sequence ==
A title sequence (also called an opening sequence or intro) is the method by which films or television programmes present their title and key production and cast members, utilizing conceptual visuals and sound (often an opening theme song with visuals, akin to a brief music video). It typically includes (or begins) the text of the opening credits, and helps establish the setting and tone of the program. It may consist of live action, animation, music, still images and graphics. In some films, the title sequence is preceded by a cold open.

=== History ===
Since the invention of the cinematograph, simple title cards were used to begin and end silent film presentations in order to identify both the film and the production company involved, and to act as a signal to viewers that the film had started and then finished. In silent cinema, title cards or intertitles were used throughout to convey dialogue and plot, and it is in some of these early short films that we see the first examples of title sequences themselves, being quite literally a series of title cards shown at the beginning of a film. With the arrival of sound, the sequence was usually accompanied by a musical prelude or overture.

Slowly, title sequences evolved to become more elaborate pieces of film. The advent of television was a pivotal moment for title design because it forced the major film studios to invest in making cinema more attractive in order to win back a diminishing audience. The "cast of thousands" epics shot on various patent widescreen formats were a direct response to television's successful invasion of the leisure marketplace. Part of cinema's new prestigious and expansive quality were orchestral overtures before the curtains opened and long title sequences — all designed to convey a sense of gravitas it was hoped television would be unable to compete with. As cinema's title sequences grew longer and more elaborate, the involvement of prominent graphic designers including Saul Bass and Maurice Binder became more common. The title sequence for Alfred Hitchcock's North by Northwest is generally cited as the first to feature extended use of kinetic typography. This innovation, in turn, influenced the 1960s television predilection for title design, resulting in the creation of strong graphics-led sequences for many television shows. Since then, the mediums of film and television have engaged in a kind of push and pull behavior, inspiring and spurring each other in different directions.

There have been several such pivotal moments in title design history. The introduction of digital technologies in the late 1980s and early 1990s to film and television changed both industries, and accordingly the 1990s saw a resurgence in title design. Ironically, a key sequence in this resurgence was the main title to David Fincher's Se7en, designed by Kyle Cooper while at R/GA, which was created using primarily analogue means. The title opticals for Se7en were created by Cinema Research Corporation, the leading title company in the 1990s. Soon thereafter, television followed suit and networks like HBO began to develop more cinematic experiences for television, including more elaborate and considered title sequences. For example, when The Sopranos first aired in 1999, it was only the second hour-long television drama that HBO had ever produced. Its title sequence "helped lend the show a credibility and gravitas normally reserved for cinema, giving it a stronger foothold in the mind and memory of the audience."

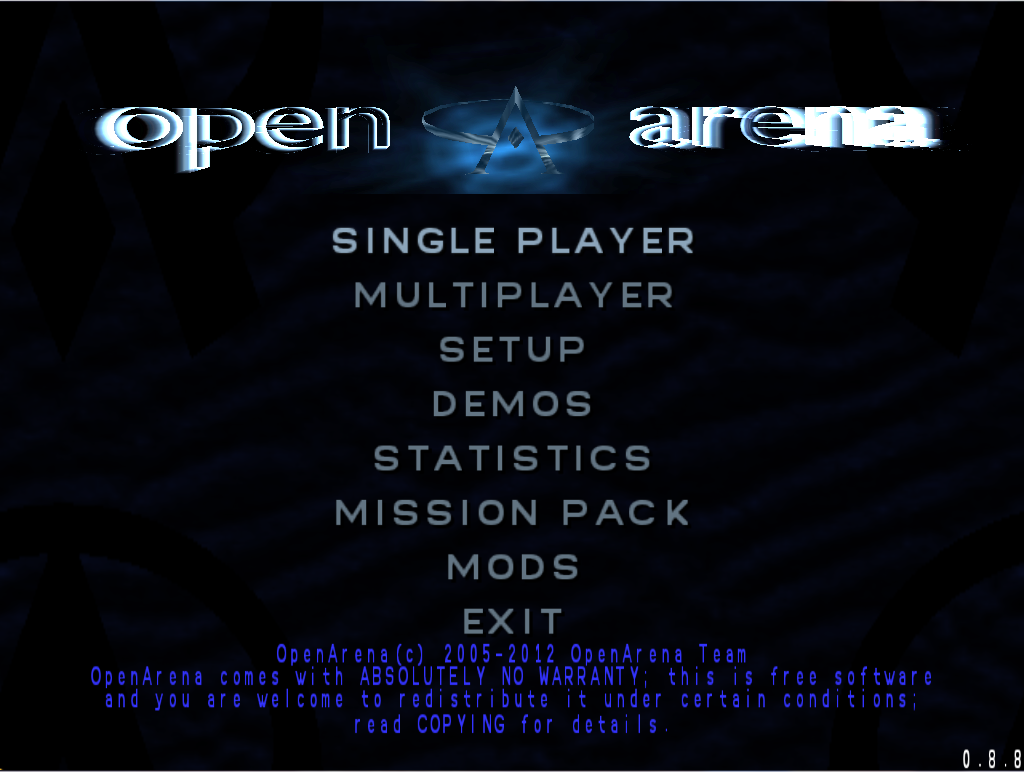
The video game OpenArena title screen

As of the beginning of the 21st century, title sequences can be found bookending a variety of media besides film and television including video games, conferences, and even music videos. The animated introduction, attract mode, title screen, and title sequence have been a major part of video games for decades. However, it is only recently that game title sequences have been able to match the quality and fidelity of film and television titles. Deus Ex: Human Revolution by Eidos Montréal and The Last of Us by Naughty Dog are two examples of Triple-A games that have employed film-style opening title sequences. Professor Layton and the Lost Future had the title following some gameplay setting up the story.

=== Films ===
- Some films have employed unusual and fairly elaborate title sequences since the late 1910s; in America this practice became more common in the 1930s. In the 1936 film Show Boat, cut-out figures on a revolving turntable carried overhead banners which displayed the opening credits. This opening sequence was designed by John Harkrider, who created the costumes for the original 1927 Broadway production of the musical.
- In several films, the opening credits have appeared against a background of (sometimes moving) clouds. These include The Wizard of Oz (1939), Till the Clouds Roll By (1946), the David Lean Oliver Twist (1948), and the 1961 King of Kings.
- In 1947, the Technicolor film Sinbad the Sailor, the letters of the opening credits seem to form from colored water gushing into a fountain.
- Film titles and credits usually appear in written form, but occasionally they are spoken instead. The first example of this in American cinema was The Terror (1928). There are also a few cases in which titles and credits are sung, including the musicals Sweet Rosie O'Grady (1943) and Meet Me After the Show (1951).
- Since the late 1950s, film title sequences have been a showcase for contemporary design and illustration. The title sequences of Saul Bass and Maurice Binder are among the best examples of this. They also inspired many imitators both in cinema and on television.
- In the 1959 film Ben-Hur, the opening credits were set against the background of the "Creation of Man" in Michelangelo's Sistine Chapel ceiling. As the credits progressed, the camera slowly zoomed in on the Hand of God outstretched toward Adam.
- In 1976, Saul Bass designed a title sequence for That's Entertainment, Part II in which he paid homage to a range of title sequences from earlier Hollywood films and replicated several novelty title sequences from the 1930s including Maytime (1937).
- Kyle Cooper's title sequence for David Fincher's Seven (1995) influenced a whole host of designers in the late 1990s. Its aesthetic has "been co-opted almost wholesale by the horror genre as a house style".
- Kenneth Branagh's Hamlet (1996) actually has no opening title sequence. The only credits seen at the beginning are the name of the production company, Shakespeare's name, and the title of the film. However, the title is shown by means of the camera slowly panning across the base of the statue of the dead king Hamlet, whose ghost will appear in three scenes of the film, and who will play a crucial role in the story.

=== Television programmes ===
Opening credits and theme music to the television cartoon series Calvin and the Colonel

Title sequences for television series have routinely played a central role in establishing the show's identity. Repeated at the beginning of every new and rebroadcast episode, usually with limited changes over the course of the series' run, they can become highly memorable. Theme music played during the sequence may be remembered clearly by viewers decades later.

Title sequences can take a variety of forms, incorporating different elements. A song may summarize the backstory or premise of the series, such as for The Brady Bunch, The Beverly Hillbillies, or Mister Ed. Less commonly, a voice-over may serve the same function, as for Star Trek, Quantum Leap, or The Twilight Zone. Often a song will more generally set the theme of the series, such as for WKRP in Cincinnati, Cheers, or All in the Family. An instrumental piece may be used the same way, as for Taxi, The Bob Newhart Show, or Dallas. A title sequence will at some point badge the show with a typographic logo. Visuals may be used to quickly present the backstory, as in I Dream of Jeannie or Gilligan's Island. Because it is produced at the outset of a series, the sequence will usually include visuals taken from early episodes already shot when it was prepared. Short clips of key characters may be used to introduce them and to credit the actors playing them, as with The Love Boat. In and around these elements may be other footage depicting the setting, or examples of scenes common to the show (e.g. car chases for a police drama, household activities for a sitcom, singing and dancing for a variety show).

Although a title sequence may be modified during a series to update cast changes or incorporate new "highlight" shots from later episodes, it will tend to remain largely the same for an entire season. Some shows have had several quite different title sequences and theme music throughout their runs, while in contrast some ever-popular shows have retained their original title sequences for decades with only minor alterations. Conversely, retaining a series' original title sequence can allow a producer to change many key elements within a programme itself, without losing the show's on-screen identity. Other variations include changing only the theme music whilst keeping the visuals or vice versa.

Some series make minor changes to the title sequence of each episode, such as superimposing a different episode title on each one. Others make minor alterations to the content of the sequence itself, to keep them from being completely repetitive each episode and to reward attentive viewers. For example, The Rockford Files would feature a different message left on the title character's answering machine, and The Simpsons features several unique elements in the title sequence of each episode (e.g. the couch gag).

In anime series, opening and ending title sequences have evolved into a distinct art form in their own right: due to the running length of a half-hour block of programming on Japanese television providing more time for the actual episode as opposed to commercials, an episode is able to budget one-and-one-half minutes each for an OP (opening sequence) and ED (ending sequence). These will invariably feature pieces of vocal music, sometimes sung by members of the voice cast for the program, and will have unique animation that thematically serves to open and close the episode; often, guest animators will be brought in to direct and provide key animation for these sequences. The OP credits will usually include director, producer, animation director, studio, music, and OP animation credits: detailed staff and voice cast is almost always reserved for the ED. In anime produced primarily for an audience of young children, karaoke lyrics to the song will sometimes be provided at the bottom of the opening and ending sequences. For further information on anime openings, see Music in Japanese animation.

Television specials, especially of classic works, sometimes contain unusual opening credit sequences. In the title sequence of Mikhail Baryshnikov's 1977 version of Tchaikovsky's ballet The Nutcracker, for example, we see closeups, freeze-frame and slow-motion shots of Baryshnikov and female lead Gelsey Kirkland "warming up" for the ballet. When the actual title appears on the screen we see Baryshnikov in his nutcracker costume and mask leaping into the air in slow motion and freeze frame. The "Overture Miniature" is heard during the opening credits.

In contemporary television news a title sequence can be changed every day, by including footage of that day's news with a presenter's voice "teasing" the items. This ensures that the title sequence appears fresh but still identifies the news program by its music and visual style.

In 2010, TV Guide published a list of American TV's top 10 credits sequences, as selected by readers. The series, in order of first to tenth, were: The Simpsons, Get Smart, The Mary Tyler Moore Show, the original Hawaii Five-O, True Blood, The Big Bang Theory, Dexter, The Brady Bunch, Mad Men, and The Sopranos.

== Closing credits ==
Example of closing credits

Closing credits to the open-source animated film Big Buck Bunny

Closing credits (also end credits or end titles) are a list of the cast and crew of a particular motion picture, television show, television film or video game. While opening credits appear at the beginning of a work, closing credits appear close to or at the very end of a work. A full set of credits can include not only the cast and crew, but also production sponsors, distribution companies, works of music licensed or written for the work, various legal disclaimers, such as copyright, and more.

=== Description ===
Closing credits appear close to or at the very end of a work. A full set of credits can include not only the cast and crew, but also production sponsors, distribution companies, works of music licensed or written for the work, various legal disclaimers, such as copyright, and more.

Closing credits are usually shown on the screen in small characters, which either flip very quickly from page to page or scroll from bottom to top of the screen. Credits which scroll either left to right or up and down are also known as staff rolls, which comes from pre-digital days when the names were literally on a roll of paper and would pass in front of the camera. Standard film credits move from bottom to top and are often called "credit crawls." Industry traditions, guild rules, and union rules generally dictate the order and placement of specific names and job titles. Increasingly, post-credits scenes are being added to the end of films. Still, short or full logos appear at the end of films (with the exception of Universal Pictures).

=== Appearance ===
Credits for motion pictures often include the name of any locales (i.e., cities, states, and countries if outside of the US) used to film scenes, as well as any organizations not related to the production (e.g., schools, government entities, military bases, etc.) that played a role in the filming.

Typically, the closing credits appear in white lettering on a solid black background, often with a musical background. Credits are either a series of static frames, or a single list that scrolls from the bottom of the screen to the top. Occasionally closing credits will divert from this standard form to scroll in another direction, include illustrations, extra scenes, bloopers, joke credits, "wrap-up" songs and post-credits scenes.

=== History ===
The use of closing credits in film to list complete production crew and the cast was not firmly established in American film until the late 1960s and early 1970s. Films generally had opening credits only, which consisted of just major cast and crew, although sometimes the names of the cast and the characters they played would be shown at the end.

Two of the first major films to contain extensive closing credits – but almost no opening credits – were the blockbusters Around the World in 80 Days (1956) and West Side Story (1961). While some television program closing credits can last 20 seconds only, for important film features, the length of extensive ending credits is typically several minutes, (5-10 in average). In 2003, for example,The Return of the King had end credits running for nine and a half minutes.

A number of more recent cinematic productions have been described as "making film credits into art".

== Billing ==
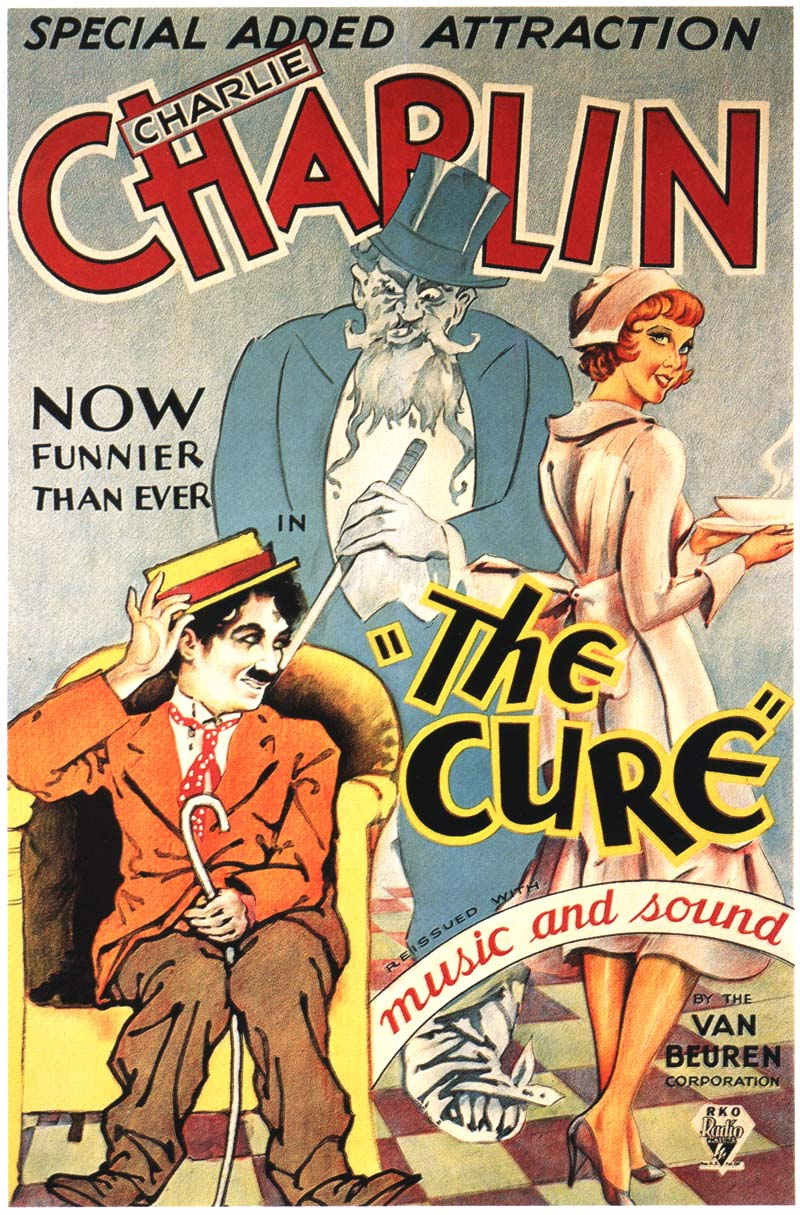
Theatrical poster to The Cure

Billing is a performing arts term used in referring to the order and other aspects of how credits are presented for plays, films, television, or other creative works. Information given in billing usually consists of the companies, actors, directors, producers, and other crew members.The title of the movie is also considered to be part of the billing. In the layout of film posters and other advertising copy, the billing is usually placed at the bottom of the poster in what is known as the billing block.

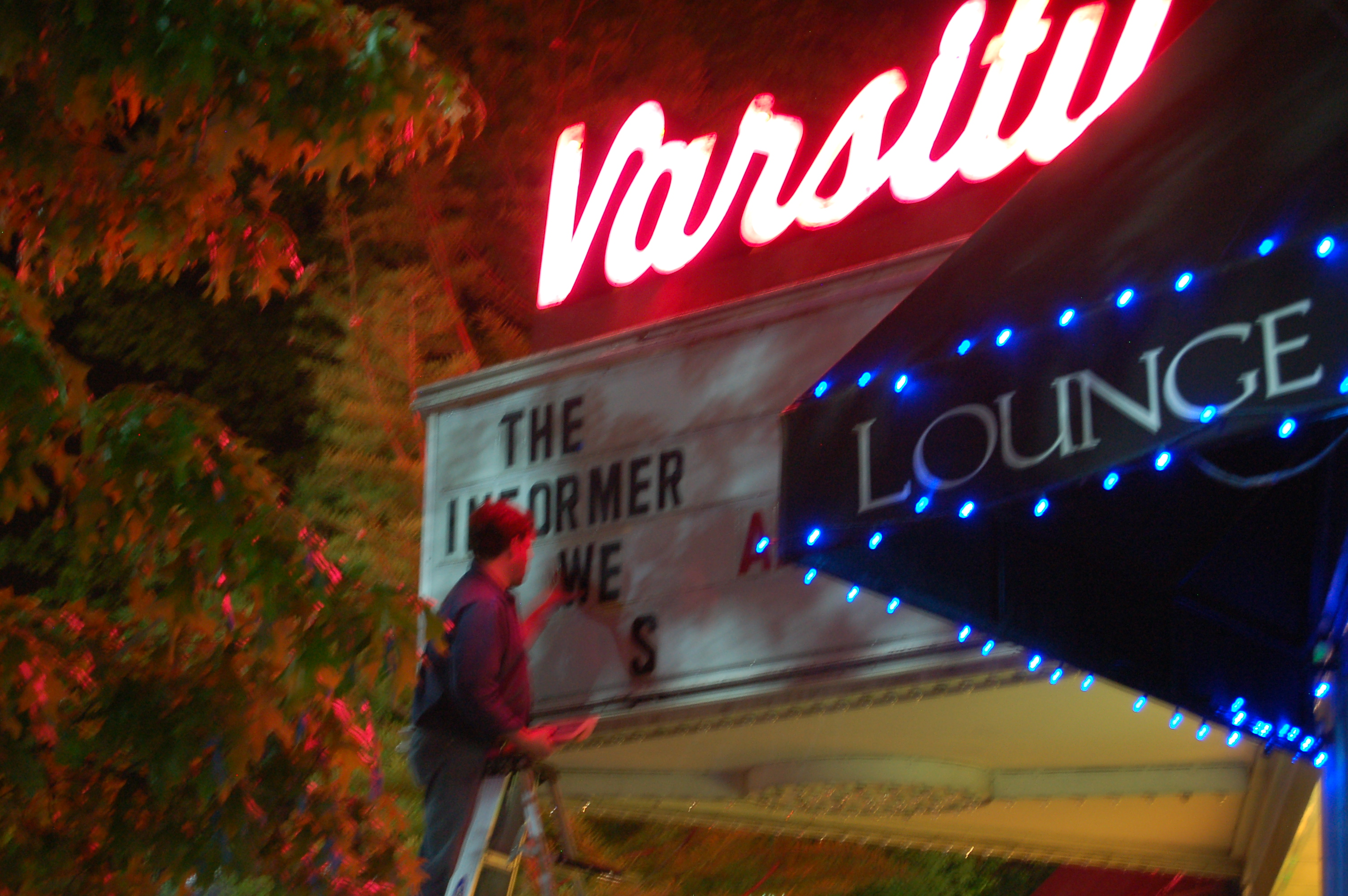
Man on a ladder, changing the billing on a marquee in Chapel Hill, North Carolina.

=== Billing block ===
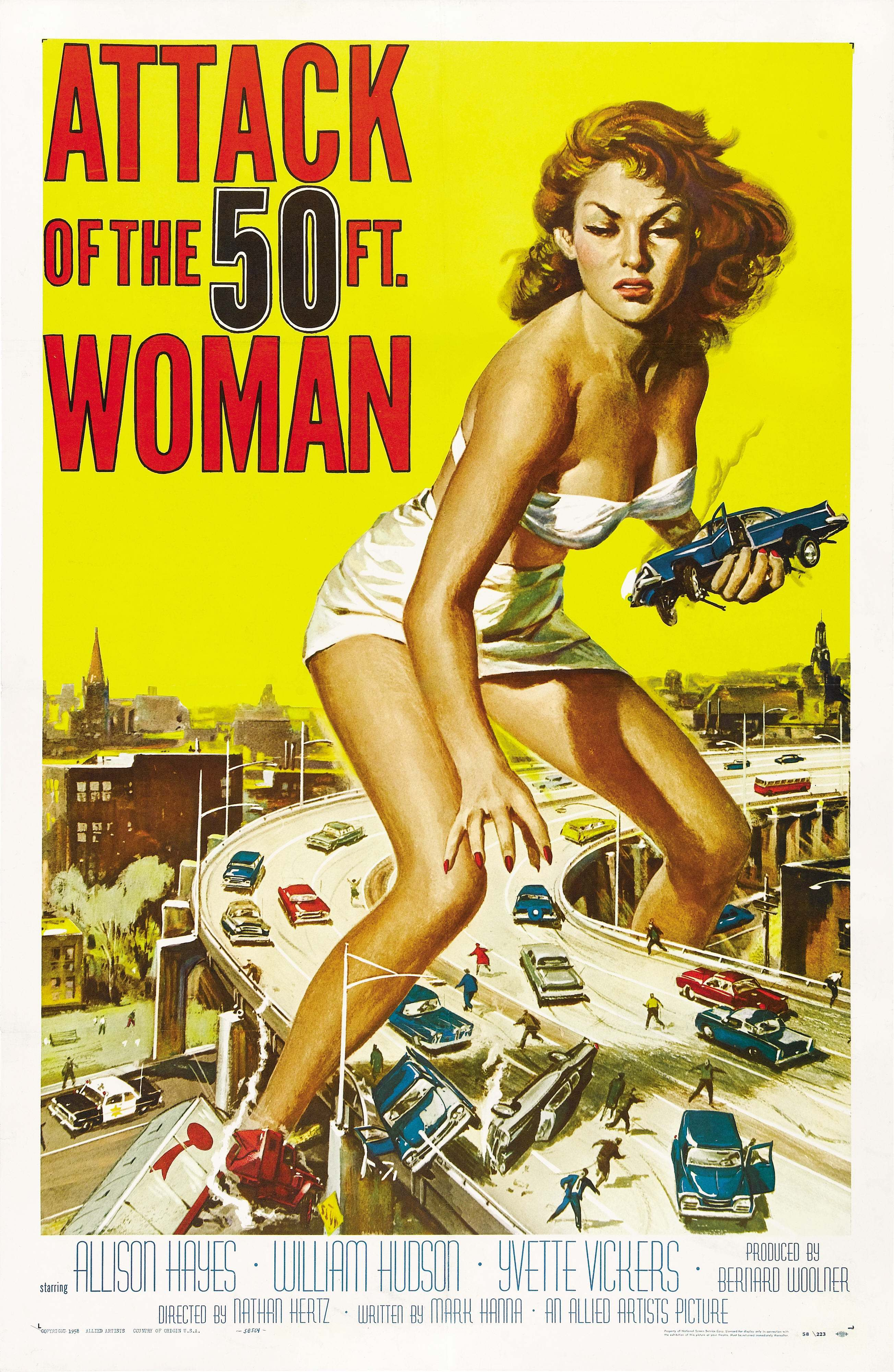
Reynold Brown's poster for Attack of the 50 Foot Woman (1958), with a billing block at the bottom.

The "billing block" is the "list of names that adorn the bottom portion of the official poster (or 'one sheet', as it is called in the movie industry) of the movie". In the layout of film posters and other film advertising copy, the billing block is usually set in a highly condensed typeface (one in which the height of characters is several times the width).

By convention, the point size of the billing block is 15 to 35 percent of the average height of each letter in the title logo. Typefaces used include Univers 39, Univers 49, and Bee. Inclusion in the credits and the billing block is generally a matter of detailed contracts between Hollywood labor unions representing creative talent and the producer or film distributor. The labor union contracts specify minimum requirements for presenting actors, writers and directors. But star talent is free to individually negotiate larger name presentations, such as when a star actor or director has his or her name above a movie's title. The union contracts also cover billing blocks in trailers, outdoor billboards, TV commercials, newspaper advertising and online advertising. Using a condensed typeface allows the heights of the characters to meet contractual constraints while still allowing enough horizontal space to include all the required text.

=== Billing order ===
The order in which credits are billed generally signify their importance. While there are numerous variations, most opening credits use some variation of the following basic order. In the absence of opening credits, these roles will often be credited in reverse order at the beginning of the closing credits.

- Name of the film studio(s)
- Production company(ies)
- Possessory credits
- Above-title billed actor(s)
- Film title
- Main cast
- Last billed actor(s)
- Casting director(s)
- Composer(s)
- Visual effects supervisor(s)
- Costume designer(s)
- Film editor(s)
- Production designer(s)
- Director(s) of photography
- Producer(s) and executive producer(s)
- Screenwriter(s)
- Director(s)

=== Possessory credits ===
Depending on their standing, the director may be granted an extra, prominent credit before the film's title (as in "A Ridley Scott Film"); this practice began with directors such as Otto Preminger, David Lean, and John Frankenheimer in the mid-1960s. Sometimes the producer or writer may also get a possessory credit. Up until the establishment of the director's possessive credit, in the early 1970s, some directors were so highly regarded that they received what seems to be a producer's credit, even if they did not produce the film. Victor Fleming was one such director: his films usually featured the credit "A Victor Fleming Production", even when someone else produced the film. James Whale was similarly credited.

Director Kevin Smith refuses to use a possessory credit, such as "A Kevin Smith Film", feeling that a movie is made by everyone involved and not the product of just the director.

=== Top and above-title billing ===
The actors whose names appear first are said to have "top billing". They usually play the principal characters in the film and have the most screen time. Frequently, top-billed actors are also named in advertising material such as trailers, posters, billboards, and TV spots.

The two or three top-billed actors in a movie will usually be announced prior to the title of the movie; this is referred to as "above-title billing". For an actor to receive it, he/she will generally have to be well-established, with box-office drawing power. Those introduced afterward are generally considered to be the supporting cast. Well-known actors may be given top billing for publicity or contractual purposes if juvenile, lesser-known, or first-time performers appear in a larger role: e.g., Marlon Brando and Gene Hackman were both credited before the title in Superman (1978), while Christopher Reeve, the then-unknown actor who played the title character and protagonist, was not, even though Brando only appears in the introduction while Hackman was the main antagonist. Similarly in Apocalypse Now, Brando was billed first even though he only appears at the end as the film's chief antagonist, while Robert Duvall was billed second despite a brief supporting role that earned him an Oscar nomination for Best Supporting Actor, and Martin Sheen, who portrayed the main character, was billed third.

It used to be common practice to give top billing based on a person's level of fame, regardless of the significance of their role in the film. For example, Marlon Brando received top billing in The Godfather (although he had less on-screen time than Al Pacino's character; Pacino was displeased that he was only nominated for the Best Supporting Actor Oscar while Brando received the Oscar for Best Actor in a Leading Role), Apocalypse Now (see above), and Superman (also see above). Maximilian Schell was billed fifth in Judgment at Nuremberg after Spencer Tracy, Burt Lancaster, Richard Widmark, and Marlene Dietrich, yet Schell went on to win the Oscar for Best Actor in a Leading Role. In recent decades, however, the practice of giving top billing to a star actor has largely been discontinued especially if they only play a bit part (see Last billing); some major actors may have a cameo where they are only noted within the other cast during the end credits.

If an unfamiliar actor has the lead role, they may be listed last in the list of principal supporting actors, their name prefixed with "and introducing" (as Peter O'Toole was in Lawrence of Arabia). However "and introducing" is now mostly used in feature films by a young actor (usually a child) who appears for the first time in a motion picture. Sometimes, they may not receive special billing even if their role is crucial. For example, the then-unknown William Warfield, who played Joe and sang "Ol' Man River" in the 1951 film version of Show Boat, received tenth billing as if he were merely a bit player, while Paul Robeson, an established star who played the same role in the 1936 film version of the musical, received fourth billing in the 1936 film.

If more than one name appears at the same time or of a similar size, then those actors are said to have "equal billing", with their importance decreasing from left to right. However, an instance of "equal importance" is The Towering Inferno (1974) starring Steve McQueen and Paul Newman. The two names appear simultaneously with Newman's on the right side of the screen and raised slightly higher than McQueen's, to indicate the comparable status of both actors' characters (this also features on the advertising poster). A similar situation occurred in 2002 with Chicago, where Renee Zellweger and Catherine Zeta-Jones received "stacked billing" on the film's poster, where a person reading from left to right would read Zeta-Jones' name first and a person reading from top to bottom would read Zellweger's name first.

If a film has an ensemble cast with no clear lead role, it is traditional to bill the participants alphabetically or in the order of their on-screen appearance. An example of the former is A Bridge Too Far (1977), which featured 14 roles played by established stars, any one of whom would have ordinarily received top billing as an individual. The cast of the Harry Potter films includes many recognized stars in supporting roles who are billed alphabetically, but after the three principals who were initially child actors.

In the case of the Kenneth Branagh Hamlet, there were many famous actors playing supporting or bit roles, and these actors were given prominent billing in the posters along with the film's actual stars: Branagh, Derek Jacobi, Julie Christie, and Kate Winslet. In the actual film's credits, they (along with the other actors in the film) were listed in alphabetical order and in the same size typeface.

If an actor is not an established star, he or she may not receive above-the-title billing, or even "star" billing; they may just be listed at the head of the cast. This is the way that all of the actors were listed in the opening credits to The Wizard of Oz; Judy Garland, although listed first, was given equal billing to all the others, with the cast list reading "with Judy Garland, Frank Morgan, Ray Bolger, Bert Lahr, Jack Haley", etc. F. Murray Abraham, a supporting actor at the time of Amadeus, did not receive special star billing although he played the lead role of Antonio Salieri; his onscreen credit reads "with F. Murray Abraham", although his name does appear first in the cast.

In some cases, the position of a name in the credits roll can become a sticking point for both cast and crew. Such was the case on the 1960s TV sitcom Gilligan's Island, where two of the stars were only mentioned by name in the closing credits. In fact, the characters of The Professor (Russell Johnson) and Mary Ann (Dawn Wells) were the only ones whose mention in the opening theme song was abbreviated simply as "the rest" in the show's first season. Bob Denver, who played Gilligan, was so upset with this treatment that he reportedly told the producers that since his contract stipulated that his name could appear anywhere in the credits that he wished, he wanted to be moved to the end credits with his co-stars. From the show's second season, the studio capitulated, and moved Denver's co-stars to the opening credits of the show, and also changed the theme song's lyrics to include "The Professor and Mary Ann" instead of saying "and the rest".

==== Competitive top billing ====
Sometimes actors can become highly competitive over the order of billing. For example:

Spencer Tracy was originally cast to play the lead opposite Humphrey Bogart in The Desperate Hours (1955), but when neither actor would relinquish top billing, Tracy withdrew and was replaced by Fredric March, who took second billing to Bogart. Bogart's role in the film had earlier been played on Broadway by Paul Newman but the young actor was not considered for the movie version since Newman, viewed by studios at the time as mainly a stage and television actor only beginning his movie career, was in no position to compete with Bogart. Tracy would also later back out of costarring in the 1965 film The Cincinnati Kid when he learned he would have to take second billing behind the film's star, Steve McQueen. The role Tracy had been cast in went instead to Edward G. Robinson, whom McQueen had idolized from childhood. Whenever it was pointed out to Tracy that he routinely took top billing in his films with Katharine Hepburn, he responded, "It's a movie, not a lifeboat."

Clark Gable had a top billing clause written into his MGM contract and made three major films in the 1930s with Tracy in supporting roles (San Francisco, Test Pilot, and Boom Town), but when Tracy renegotiated his contract during World War II, he had a similar clause included in his own contract, effectively ending the hugely popular Gable-Tracy team.

In the opening credits of The Bridge on the River Kwai (1957), Alec Guinness, who is generally regarded as the main character in the film, receives third billing, after William Holden (who demanded top billing) and Jack Hawkins (who does not even appear until halfway through the picture). In the closing credits, Guinness is billed second, with Hawkins third.

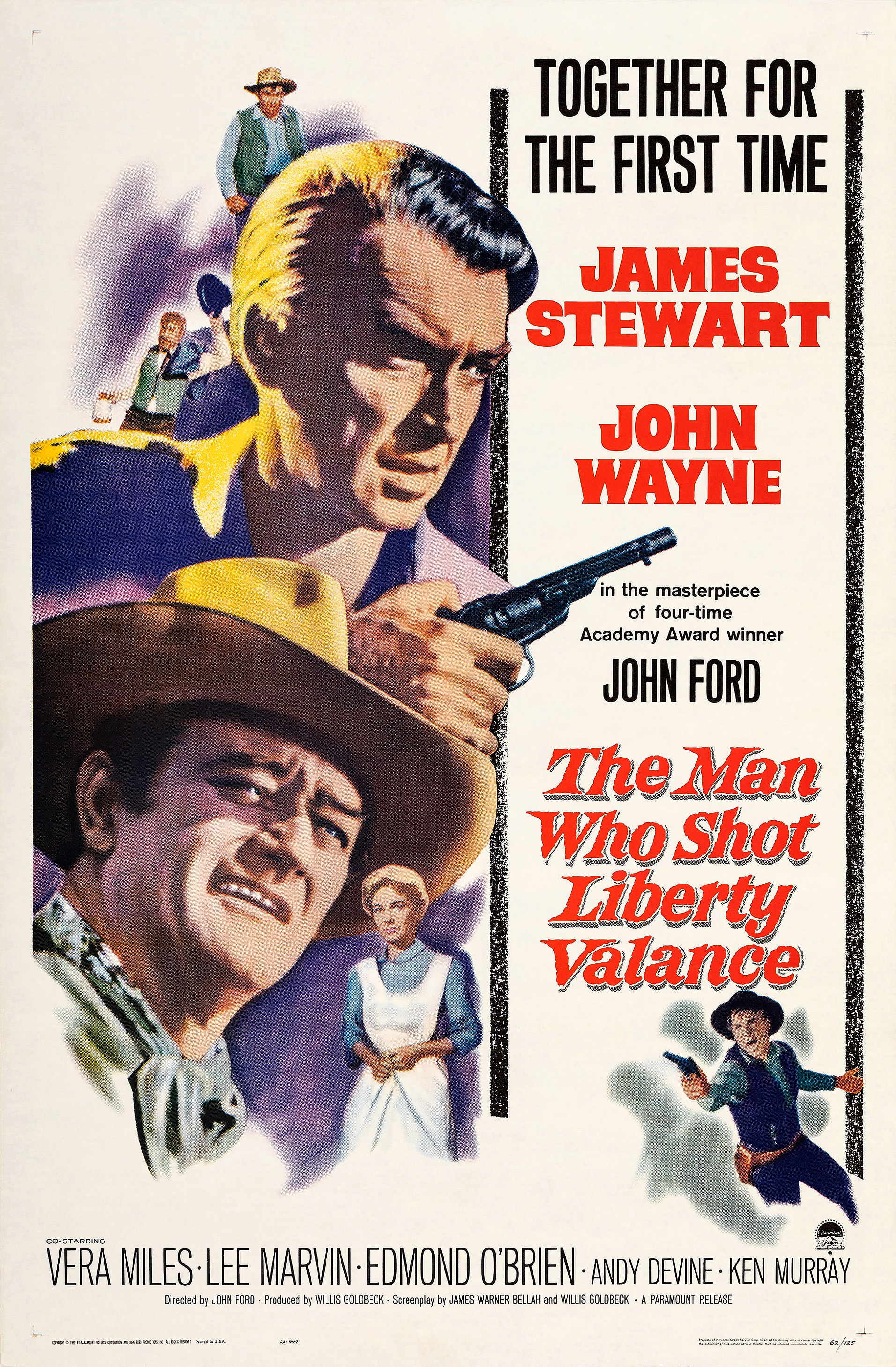
John Wayne was billed second on posters and in trailers but first in the film itself for The Man Who Shot Liberty Valance (1962).

For The Man Who Shot Liberty Valance (1962), James Stewart was given top billing over John Wayne in the movie's posters and the previews (trailers) shown in cinemas and on television prior to the film's release, but in the film itself, Wayne is accorded top billing. Their names are displayed on pictures of signposts, one after the other, with Wayne's name shown first with his sign mounted slightly higher on its post than Stewart's. Director John Ford remarked in an interview with Peter Bogdanovich that he made it apparent to the audience that Vera Miles' character had never entirely recovered from an abortive romance with Wayne's gunslinging rancher because "I wanted Wayne to be the lead." Dustin Hoffman and Robert Redford used precisely the same billing formula for All the President's Men (1976), with Redford receiving top billing in posters and trailers while Hoffman was billed over Redford in the film itself. In 2021, Don't Look Up used exactly the same approach, with Leonardo DiCaprio receiving top billing on the posters and in the trailers while Jennifer Lawrence was accorded top billing at the beginning of the film itself.

As both Tony Curtis and Jerry Lewis wanted top billing for Boeing Boeing (1965), their animated names appeared in a spinning, circular fashion in front of an airplane engine's nacelle. For the trailer, the circular animation of the two names was repeated and neither name was spoken aloud. For the posters, the names made an X, Lewis' going up from the bottom left and Curtis' going down from the upper left.

For the film The Towering Inferno (1974), Steve McQueen, Paul Newman and William Holden all tried to obtain top billing. Holden was refused as his diminished star power was no longer considered to be in the league of McQueen's and Newman's. To provide dual top billing and mollify McQueen, the credits were arranged diagonally, with McQueen at the lower left and Newman at the upper right. Thus, each actor appeared to have top billing depending on whether the poster was read from left to right or top to bottom. Technically, McQueen has top billing and is mentioned first in the film's trailers; however, at the end of the movie, as the cast's names roll from the bottom of the screen, Newman's name is fully visible first, giving him top billing in the closing credits. This was the first time that this type of "staggered but equal" billing had been used for a movie, although the same thing had been discussed for the same two actors five years earlier when McQueen was going to play the Sundance Kid in Butch Cassidy and the Sundance Kid (1969). McQueen ultimately passed on the part and was replaced by Robert Redford, who did not enjoy McQueen's status and took second billing to Newman. Today, it has become understood that whoever's name appears to the left has top billing, but this was by no means the case when The Towering Inferno was produced. This same approach has often been used subsequently, including Cruel Intentions (1999), Sky Captain and the World of Tomorrow (2004), and Righteous Kill (2008) starring Robert De Niro and Al Pacino.

In The Bonfire of the Vanities (1990), F. Murray Abraham asked for above-title billing. This was rejected as too many other stars were getting it (Tom Hanks, Bruce Willis, Melanie Griffith). Thus, Abraham asked for his name to be completely removed, even from the closing credits. That same year, Raúl Juliá requested above the title billing alongside Robert Redford and Lena Olin for the drama Havana. When the producers rejected this, he decided to go uncredited. Eleven years later, Don Cheadle did exactly the same thing when his name was not allowed to appear above the title in Ocean's Eleven (2001), presumably because his name would have alphabetically preceded George Clooney's and, unlike with the later sequels, the cast above the title was presented alphabetically (Clooney, Matt Damon, Andy García, Brad Pitt, and Julia Roberts). Cheadle removed his name from the credits. The producers apparently wanted Clooney, not Cheadle, to be the first name a casual viewer of the advertising would see.

In Batman (1989), Jack Nicholson demanded top billing and a share of the film's earnings (including associated merchandise), even though Michael Keaton played the titular character while Nicholson's Joker was the antagonist.

In the film Miami Vice (2006), Colin Farrell originally received top billing. However, after Jamie Foxx won an Academy Award he demanded top billing and received it despite his role actually being much smaller than Farrell's. Foxx's name appears first in the opening credits, while Farrell still receives top billing in the closing credits.

In a comedic commercial for Michael and Michael Have Issues (2009), the aforementioned characters mock-argue over who gets top billing for their show.

=== Last billing ===
An actor may receive "last billing", which usually designates a smaller role played by a famous actor. They are usually credited after the rest of the lead cast, prefixed by "and" or "with". In some cases, for extra emphasis the actor's name is followed by "as" and the name of the character (thus called an "and-as" credit).

An early example of last billing is found in the 1931 classic Frankenstein, which simply listed a question mark (?) as portraying the monster. Reissued prints add actor Boris Karloff to the end credit listings, as the film made him a huge star, such that the credits of the film's first sequel The Bride of Frankenstein credits him only by his last name.

One of the first "and-as" credits was given to Spencer Tracy ("as Lieutenant Colonel James H. Doolittle") in the 1944 World War II film Thirty Seconds Over Tokyo, since another top box office star of the time, Van Johnson, had top billing, but Tracy was too big a star to receive second billing. In promotional posters and screen credits, Tracy's name is displayed in larger letters than Johnson's.

Occasionally, films have both an "and-as" credit and a separate last billing credit, such as the Irwin Allen 1978 disaster film The Swarm, the opening credits of which, after listing a large cast of stars, concludes with "Fred MacMurray as Clarence ... and Henry Fonda".

=== Unbilled appearances ===
An actor may choose to go unbilled (i.e., uncredited) and not be listed, either being entirely omitted from screen credits, or only listed in the closing credits. Reasons for this vary.

Unbilled roles often feature cameo appearances by famous actors or actresses who pop up in a movie as a face in a crowd, a man on a bench, or other 'background' characters, who are given screen time for a brief, but recognizable, moment. For example, Bing Crosby and Bob Hope appeared momentarily in a circus audience during The Greatest Show on Earth.

Sometimes, actors can be recognized, but are not credited for contractual and/or financial reasons; if they receive credit, they would be due payment commensurate with their fame. For example, James Cagney is clearly glimpsed during the opening scenes of Mutiny on the Bounty (1935) starring Charles Laughton and Clark Gable. Cagney was contracted to Warner Bros. at the time and was arguably their biggest star, but he only appears briefly as an unbilled and presumably unpaid extra at the beginning of the rival MGM studio's seagoing epic.

Examples of reasons why an actor is not credited follow.

- As Gary Oldman appeared under heavy make-up in Hannibal, he requested that his name be completely removed from the billing and credits in order to "do it anonymously". However, Nathan Murray is still credited as "Mr. Oldman's assistant" and Oldman's name was added to the end credits upon the film's home video release.
- Even though Gene Hackman had a prominent role in The Firm he chose not to receive any billing credit because Tom Cruise was afforded sole, above the title, top billing with the letters of his name equal to that of the film title.
- For suspense purposes, Kevin Spacey, in Seven, requested not to be credited in the opening titles or in any advertising for the film. His name appears in the closing credits.
- In the 1995 Star Trek: Deep Space Nine episode "Heart of Stone," Salome Jens agreed to be listed in the end credits (rather than in the opening credits as usual) to avoid spoiling the surprise that her recurring character was impersonating one of the lead characters. She was listed as "Special Guest Star" rather than "Guest Star."
- Also on Star Trek: Deep Space Nine, Frank Langella declined to be credited in three episodes despite playing a central guest role. He did not want to give the impression he had taken the role for money or exposure, as he had actually taken it to please his children.
- In the opening of 1931's Frankenstein, the credit for "The Monster" is a question mark. Boris Karloff is named in the closing credits.
- Ashton Kutcher appears as Hank in the 2003 family comedy Cheaper by the Dozen and is uncredited, although he is one of the film's main characters.
- In the 1974 film Earthquake, Walter Matthau agreed to provide a cameo performance without compensation on the condition that he not be credited under his real name; he was credited under a fictitious name of his choosing, "Walter Matuschanskayasky".
- Because he played the part without pay, Bruce Willis is not credited for his prominent role in the portion of Four Rooms directed by Quentin Tarantino.
- Owen Wilson does not receive credit for his "Jedidiah" character in Night at the Museum, though he receives credit in the sequel, Battle of the Smithsonian.
- John Wayne was billed as "Michael Morris" in two cameo television appearances directed by John Ford, an episode of Wagon Train titled "The Colter Craven Story" and an anthology installment called Flashing Spikes starring James Stewart. Wayne's real name, before it was changed for the 1930 widescreen film The Big Trail, was Marion Robert Morrison (his widely reported middle name of Michael was apparently a change made by studio publicists after he became famous as Wayne).
- For his cameo appearances in Cabin Boy and Beavis and Butt-head Do America, David Letterman was billed as "Earl Hofert".
- In Interstellar, Matt Damon's casting was kept secret during production, and he is not credited in the film. This was a deliberate decision by the director Christopher Nolan, as he uses the audience's familiarity with Matt Damon as a 'good guy' actor to hide his character's true intentions.
- David Hyde Pierce declined to be credited for his voice-acting role in Hellboy because he felt it was the physical performance of Doug Jones, and not his own voice, which ultimately brought the character of Abe Sapien to life.

=== Screenwriters billing ===
Writing credits for films and TV shows written under the jurisdiction of the Writers Guild of America (WGA) use the WGA screenwriting credit system. For writers who belong to the WGA, the writing credits affect reputation, union membership, and income. Under the rules, the film producer must first submit the proposed writing credits for the project to both the WGA and all the participating writers. If any participating writer objects to the proposed credits, it then enters arbitration, with the WGA being the final arbiter.

The WGA rules help dictate whether a screenplay should be classified as "original" or is instead based on another source. If based on another source, an additional "Based on a book/play/other source by" is generally required. In the case of a sequel to the film, the credited writers of the original motion picture may be entitled to a "Based on characters created by" credit.

The WGA's rules also outlines when credits can be apportioned separately for the story, and for the screenplay itself when all writers were not equally involved in the creation of both. When the same writers are entitled to both "Screenplay by" and "Story by" credit, they will instead by listed under one "Written by" credit.

For writing teams of two, they are credited as one, separated on the credits by an ampersand ("X & Y"). If each works independently on the script (the most common system), they are separated by an "and". If more than two persons worked on the screenplay, the credits may read like "screenplay by X & Y and Z and W", where X and Y worked as a team, but Z and W worked separately.

The WGA system also puts limits on the number of writers: on films, "Screenplay by", "Teleplay by", and "Written by" credit each can list no more than three writers (or writing teams).

=== Director billing ===
The Directors Guild of America (DGA) requires that a film lists only one director, even if more than one director has worked on the film, with few exceptions, such as for directing teams like the Coen brothers. If the main credits occur at the beginning, then the director's name is last to be shown before the film's narrative starts, as a result of an agreement between the DGA and motion picture producers in 1939. If all billing is shown at the end, the director's name will be displayed first, immediately followed by the writing credits.

- In 1980, George Lucas resigned from the DGA after it insisted, against his wishes, that Irvin Kershner, the director of The Empire Strikes Back, be credited at the beginning of the film because the company name Lucasfilm was there; it had previously allowed the original Star Wars (1977), which had a similar opening sequence, to go unchallenged because the writer-director credit (George Lucas) matched the company name Lucasfilm Ltd.
- Ben-Hur is one of the few MGM films in which the director receives very prominent billing in the posters advertising the movie – the posters state "William Wyler's Production of", although the same credit does not appear in the actual on-screen credits. A similar example is David Lean, whose Doctor Zhivago and Ryan's Daughter both carry the credit "David Lean's Film of" (followed by the title). Stanley Kubrick received prominent title billing from Dr. Strangelove (1964) onwards, and from A Clockwork Orange (1971) he generally received main billing, with the actors only listed in the billing block. Advertising materials for Kubrick's Eyes Wide Shut featured the billing "CRUISE / KIDMAN / KUBRICK".
- Filmmaker and playwright Tyler Perry always inserts his name into the title of each of his films and television shows. For instance: Tyler Perry's Why Did I Get Married? or Tyler Perry's Meet the Browns. To date, the only film he has not done this with is For Colored Girls, which is an adaptation of the Ntozake Shange play For Colored Girls Who Have Considered Suicide When the Rainbow Is Enuf.
- In 2004 Robert Rodriguez quit the DGA because he wanted to credit Frank Miller as "co-director" on the film Sin City.

== See also ==
- Acknowledgment – Expression of gratitude for assistance in creating a work
- All persons fictitious disclaimer – Tort law concept
- Character generator – Device for adding text and graphics to a video stream
- Credit – Expression of gratitude for assistance in creating a work
- Digital on-screen graphic – Television station logo used as a watermark
- Lower third – Graphic overlay in lower area of TV screen
- Production babies – Children born to people working on a film
- WGA screenwriting credit system – Credit system for motion pictures and television programs in the United States
- Broadcast designer
- Character generator
- Cinema Research Corporation
- Digital on-screen graphic
- Production logo
- Unintentional defamation § Fictitious persons disclaimer
