= Broadcast designer =

Graphic designer for television productions

A broadcast designer is a person involved with creating graphic designs and electronic media incorporated in television productions that are used by character generator (CG) operators. A broadcast designer may have a degree in digital media (or a similar degree), or is self-taught in the software needed to create such content. CG stands for computer graphics, most broadcast designers studied either graphic design or visual communication – this term is used for those designing motion graphics also for film, industrials, commercials, and the web.

Broadcast designers take part in their field in creating visual content that combines creativity and technology. Broadcast design is the creation and combination of visual elements in a television production or television shows. These elements can include news graphics, channel logos, animation, and more. Broadcast designers not only have to be creative with visuals and aesthetics, but also have to have an understanding of storytelling and the technology behind it. With this being said, they need to have the ability to create eye-catching visuals while also sending a message. All of these elements play a role in shaping what TV broadcasts, entertainment shows, and multimedia platforms look today.

A large portion of broadcast design is known as "branding" for television channels and programs. The job of the designer is to create a look and feel for a specific idea or subject. Often, television stations will wish to re-invent their style or "on air look" – this is where the broadcast designer's skills are called upon to design lower third digital on-screen graphics (DOG or BUG) and motion graphics.

Another industry which is reliant on a designer's skill is the television commercial advertising market. Most often, a client will hire an advertising agency which will then hire a group of designers to produce a commercial for their product. The process usually begins with a concept or an idea which the client has or the agency comes up with. It is then further explored in design boards which go up for approval by the client before the process of making it actually begins.

== Types of Broadcast Design ==
There are many types of different broadcast designs. Each broadcast design has different unique techniques, topics, goals, and target audiences. Broadcast designers need to focus their work on the specific genre or topic geared to a specific audience. Knowing their audience can assist the broadcast designer on what ideas they need to be thinking about when they create their design and this keeps audiences engaged at all times. The different designs include:

- news broadcast graphics
- sports broadcast graphics
- award ceremony designs
- commercial graphic designs
- infographics

=== News and sports broadcast graphics ===
ESPN is one of the top multi-platform sports broadcast and entertainment channels.

News broadcast graphics and sports broadcast graphics go hand in hand. They are a collection of graphics generated by a computer and are used throughout a news program on television. These graphics are to assist and enhance an organization’s brand. These graphics also build the storytelling aspect of a brand by giving additional information and context about that specific brand. Visuals and animated elements help inform and engage viewers as well. Some examples of different news and sports broadcast teams that may use these graphics are ESPN, NBC, and CBS.

=== Award ceremony designs ===
Broadcast designs graphics for prominent award shows that combine creativity and technical skills to represent the aspects of the show itself. These graphics add drama and emphasis to the show and keep the audience members fully engaged and attentive. Some award ceremonies that include graphic design include:

- The Academy Awards (Oscars)
- The Grammy Awards
- The Tony Awards
- The Emmy Awards

=== Commercial graphic design ===
Commercial graphic design is the creation of visual content for audiences. This visual content can include advertisements logos, and websites to promote a brand’s message and purpose. It includes a visual blend between images and texts so that the audience is fully aware of what is being marketed.

=== Infographics ===
Infographics are informational representations that include data such as graphs, charts, and images about complex information to make it easier for the intended audience to understand and learn. Infographics are more eye-catching than a regular document and they are more engaging to individuals as well.

== Tools used in broadcast design ==
Many professional broadcast and graphic designers use photoshop to create their work.

Broadcast designers use a variety of different tools and technologies to create, distribute, and convey their work to viewers. Tools and equipment can differ based on the size, budget, and technological preferences of different broadcast centers. The different tools and technology include:

- Adobe Photoshop
- Embedder
- Adobe Animate (also known as Flash)
- Cinema 4D

All of these different tools guide broadcast designers to a much easier way of creating their designs. These tools can also be specific for different tasks for a variety of audiences that are made for them.

== Social media and broadcast design ==
Social media has played a big role in broadcast designing because of the revolutionized TV production and the consumption of the media. Individuals use social media every single day of their lives and are consuming news and updates by the media which allows broadcast designers to make broadcasting much easier. Instagram, Facebook, TikTok, and many other platforms allow for more engagement and marketing strategies that can reach a variety of audiences. With this, broadcast is not as restricted and limited, but has become more accessible for everyone of all ages who wants to learn more about the society around them.

== Challenges faced by broadcast designers ==
A major challenge faced by broadcast designers is multiple digital media platforms resulting in widely spread target audience making it hard for the designers to adapt and engage across multiple platforms. Moreover multiple age groups within audience makes it difficult is creating generic content and designs that are understandable and relatable to all. Other than traditional advertising, designers also explore sponsorships, partnerships, and brand deals to stay profitable.

== Famous broadcast and graphic designers ==
- Saul Bass
- Milton Glaser
- Paul Rand

These three individuals are known for their work in branding and advertising.

== See also ==
- Acknowledgment (creative arts)
- Billing (filmmaking)
- Character generator
- Closing credits
- Credit (creative arts)
- Digital on-screen graphic (BUG)
- Graphics coordinator
- Lower third
- Production logo
- Score bug
- Title sequence
- WGA screenwriting credit system
- Television news screen layout
