= Production babies =

Children born to people working on a film

Production babies are children born to anyone involved in the making of a film during its production. The phrase generally refers to a section of the closing credits of films, listing the babies' given names. The custom of publishing lists of production babies began with animated films, and is still chiefly found in that medium, reflecting the influence of family experiences on storytelling in such films. The custom has also become commonplace in video game production credits.

== Concept and examples ==
=== Film ===
The first list of production babies was included by Pixar in the credits of their first full-length movie Toy Story in 1995.

Lee Unkrich, a film director with Pixar, explains that the production team and film crew indelibly associate the birth of each of their children with the film they were working on at the time. The listing in the end credits becomes a way for them to share these essential memories more widely. "It's like our family lives are permanently woven into the movies." Twists added in film credits include a list of "Chameleon Kids" at the end of the 2010 animated film Tangled, born to the real-life model for the pet in the film. The 2011 animated film Winnie the Pooh lists the names under "Pooh Babies", with the credit knitted on a scarf by the character Kanga. In the 2014 Laika film The Boxtrolls the babies are listed as "Boxtrolls Babies". In the 2020 Disney/Pixar film Soul, the babies are listed as "Recent You Seminar Graduates", in keeping with the theme of the film. Another instance is Lightyear in 2022 where the babies are listed as "Future Space Rangers". The babies' instance was used again in the end credits of Elio, where they were listed as "Future Earth Ambassadors", and again in Hoppers, where they were listed as "Production Kits".

Disney film director Byron Howard cites the listing of production babies as a pointer to the depth of personal relationships established during collaboration on an animated movie.

A star next to a baby's name honors a baby who died before production was complete. One example can be found in the end credits of Moana for a baby named Cooper.

In 2009, Ari Folman dedicated his Golden Globe Award to the eight production babies born during the making of Waltz with Bashir, an animated anti-war documentary, and expressed hope that their lives would have no contact with the realities of conflict depicted in the film.

Reviewers have noted that "production babies" credits indicate the creativity of film people in giving some unusual names to their children.

=== Video games ===
An early, isolated instance in video games occurred with an Easter egg message embedded in the ROM for the 1988 game Spiker! Super Pro Volleyball for Mattel Intellivision. The modern custom spread to video game credits in the 2005 game Call of Duty 2, and the 2009 game Call of Duty: Modern Warfare 2, which also listed the other parents. The title of the list was changed to "Development Babies" in Call of Duty: Modern Warfare 3.
