= Character generator =

Device for adding text and graphics to a video stream

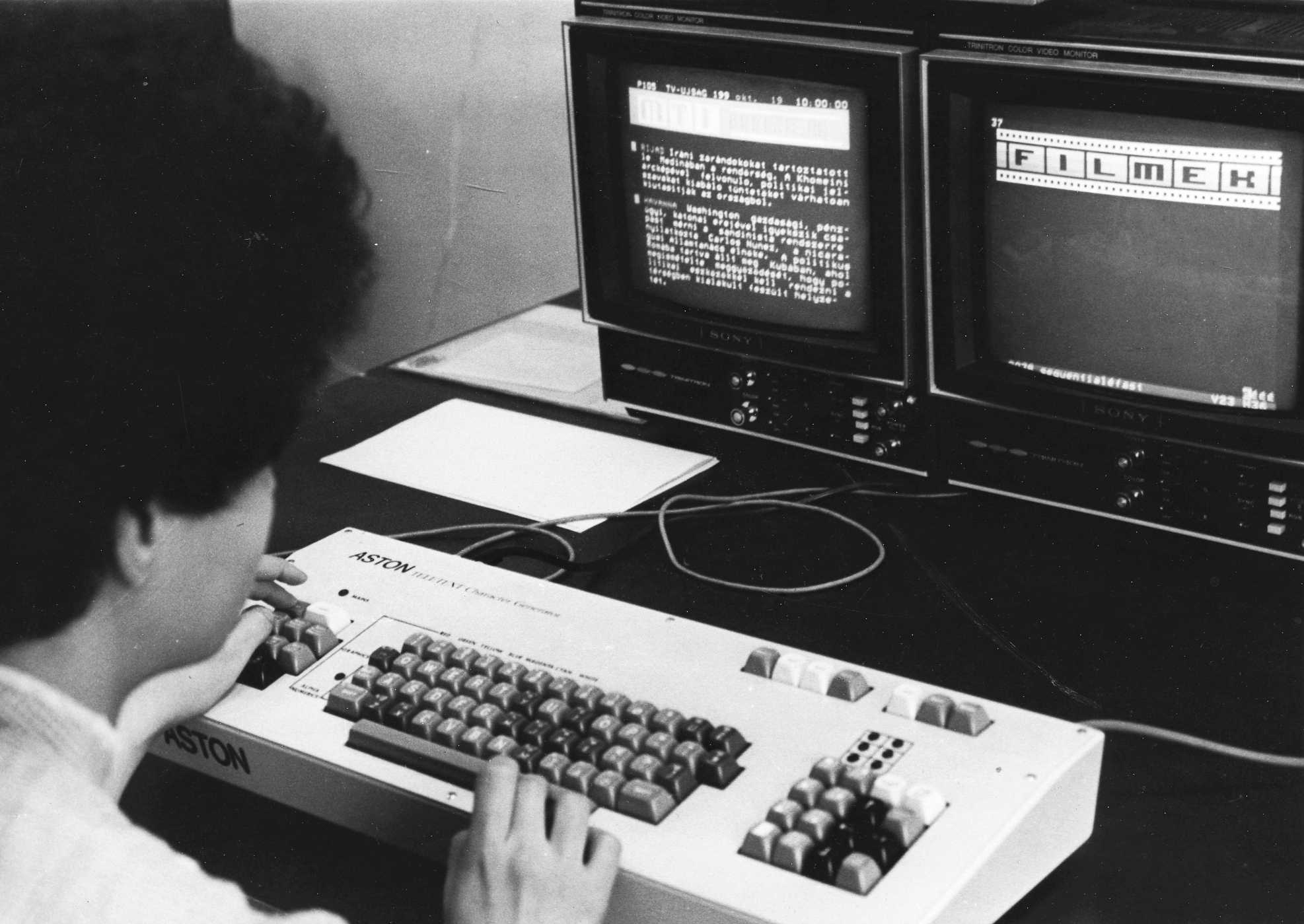
Hungarian hardware character generator used for teletext

A character generator, often abbreviated as CG, is a device or software that produces static or animated text (such as news crawls and credits rolls) for keying into a video stream. Modern character generators are computer-based, and they can generate graphics as well as text.

== History ==
Monoscopes were used as character generators for text mode video rendering in computer displays for a short time in the 1960s. The CBS Laboratories Vidiac, and the A. B. Dick Videograph 990 System, were among the earliest character generators for broadcast television. CBS Laboratories later developed the more advanced Vidifont system in preparation for the 1968 US presidential elections, where a rapid method of all-electronic character generation was required so that news outlets could identify unexpected interviewees on the spot. A similar generator using analogue electronics, Anchor, was developed by the BBC in 1970 and used in the general election later that year.

== Usage ==
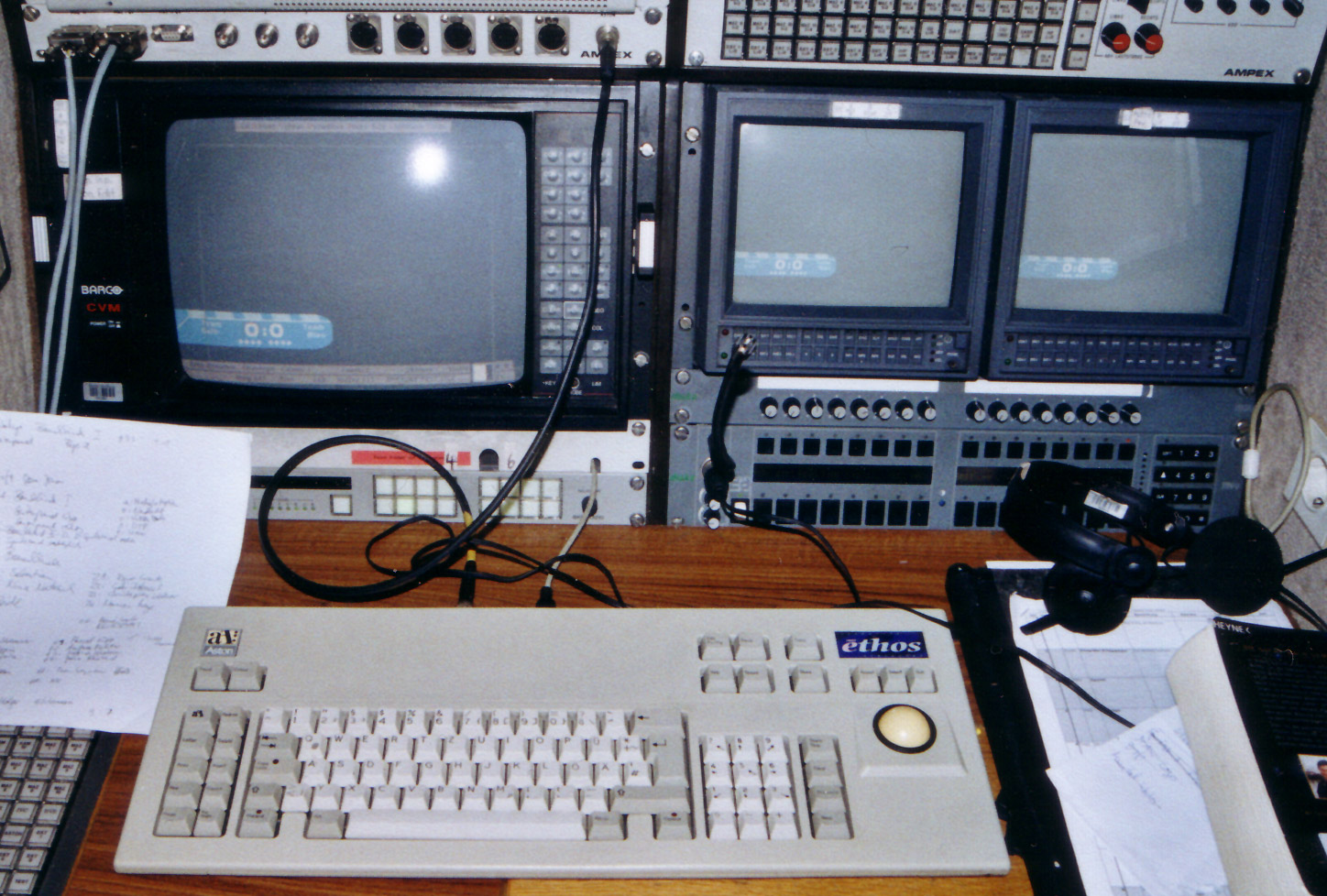
An Aston Ethos hardware character generator

In the television business in North America, the digital on-screen graphics generated by character generators are also often called "chyrons", after the Chyron Corporation, whether or not Chyron made the character generator. Similarly, in the United Kingdom, such graphics are often called "Astons", after Aston Broadcast Systems. These are examples of genericized trademarks.

Character generators are primarily used in the broadcast areas of live television sports or television news presentations, given that the modern character generator can rapidly (i.e., "on the fly") generate high-resolution, animated graphics for use when an unforeseen situation in a broadcast dictates an opportunity for breaking news coverage—for example, when, in a football game, a previously unknown player begins to have what looks to become an outstanding day, the character generator operator can rapidly build a new graphic using the template "shell" of a similarly designed graphic. The character generator is one of many technologies used to meet the demands of live television, where events on the field or in the newsroom dictate the direction of the coverage. As character generator development has progressed, the distinction between hardware and software generators has become less distinct as new platforms and operating systems evolve to meet the live television consumer's expectations.

== Methods ==
Before character generators were available, the primary method of adding titles to video images was to dedicate one camera to shooting white letters on a black background, which was then combined with the video from a live-action camera to form what appeared to be a single image with white letters seemingly superimposed over it. In fact, to this day (and despite the fact that this technology is long-since antiquated by the modern CG), some directors of live TV continue to order the technical director (TD) to "add the super" when they want the CG output "superimposed" over the image of another camera. As technology advanced, the ability to "key" (compositing) these white letters over live video became available, involving electronically "cutting a hole" (analogous to cutting a keyhole) in the shape of the letters from the title camera and then electronically adding the letters to the holes cut into the live action camera image. Again, some directors still call this "keying the graphic". Finally, the modern CG allowed not only more precise and realistic "keying", but also the addition of multiple picture elements from the CG to further the illusion of a three-dimensional graphic physically overlying a video image. The addition of full-motion graphics from the CG and the animation of graphic elements by the CG blur the line between "character generator" and "computer graphics", combining the CG's ability to elegantly present graphics and video with the computer's ability to interface with game scoring and timing systems, to keep running totals of an athlete's performance on the field or the court and to derive statistics both for individual players and the teams involved, and to interface with computer systems located at other game venues or at a television network's master control central broadcast center. On televised sporting events, score bugs are present. They contain CG data from that game, CG data from other games in progress, other games already completed, and games yet to come, all in an effort to keep the viewer from having to "channel surf" to another station to watch another television program. Viewers who do not change channels watch the first channel's television advertising (also included in CG output), which then generates revenue for the television network.

Although the distinction between hardware and software CGs is becoming less evident as technology advances, and as consumer-grade computing equipment becomes more graphically sophisticated, it remains easiest to view CGs as either hardware- or software-dependent.

== Hardware character generators ==
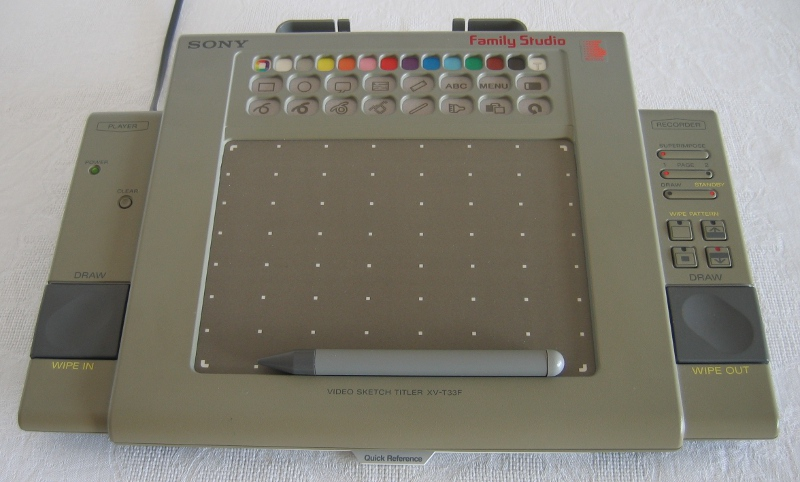
Hardware character generator for home and semiprofessional use (1994; operated by a pen on a drawing area)

Creation of a title with the above shown hardware character generator (1994; the menu displayed on the TV screen is controlled by the pen movement on the drawing area)

Hardware character generators are used in television studios and video editing suites. A desktop publishing-like interface can be used to generate static and moving text or graphics, which the device then encodes into some high-quality video signal, like serial digital interface (SDI) or analog component video, high definition or even RGB video. They also provide a key signal, which the compositing vision mixer can use as an alpha channel to determine which areas of the CG video are translucent.

== Integrated circuits ==
Several companies implemented dedicated character generators into integrated circuits. These were used in early home computers and display terminals before the advent of graphics cards. For example, the Signetics 2513 was used in the Apple I and first generation Apple II. By 1970, Texas Instruments had manufactured a variety of character generator ICs, including the TMS 2400 series, TMS 4100 series, and the TMS 4880 series.

== Software character generators ==
Software CGs run on standard off-the-shelf computer hardware and are often integrated into video editing software such as non-linear editing system (NLE). Some stand-alone character generator products are available; however, for applications that do not even attempt to offer text generation on their own, as high-end video editing software often does, or whose internal CG effects are not flexible and powerful enough. Some software CGs can be used in live production with special software and computer video interface cards. In that case, they are equivalent to hardware generators.

== See also ==
- 1st & Ten (graphics system)
- Acknowledgment (creative arts)
- Barker channel
- Billing (filmmaking)
- Broadcast automation
- Broadcast designer
- Clean feed (TV)
- Closing credits
- Credit (creative arts)
- Digital asset
- Digital on-screen graphic (BUG)
- Graphics coordinator
- Local insertion
- Lower third
- Motion graphic design
- News ticker
- Opening credits
- Production logo
- Rasterisation
- Score bug
- Signetics, producer of the 2513 CG chip
- Station identification
- Side-By-Side (graphic)
- Text mode
- Title sequence
- Video production
- WGA screenwriting credit system
