= Telop =

Slide projector for television; in Japan, any text superimposed on a TV screen

A TELOP (TELevision OPtical Slide Projector) was the trademark name of a multifunction, four-channel "project-all" slide projector developed by the Gray Research & Development Company for television usage, introduced in 1949. It was best remembered in the industry as an opaque slide projector for title cards.

== Before Telop ==
In the early days of television, there were two types of slides for broadcast—a transparent slide or transparency, and an opaque slide, or Balop (a genericized trademark of Bausch & Lomb's Balopticon projectors). Transparency slides were prepared as 2-inch square cards mounted in cardboard or glass, or 4 in × 3.25 in (102 mm × 83 mm) film, surrounded by a half-inch of masking on all four sides. Opaque, "Balop" slides were cards on 4 in × 3 in (102 mm × 76 mm) stock or larger (always maintaining the 4:3 aspect ratio) that were photographed by the use of a Balopticon. Opaque cards were popular as shooting a card on a stand often caused keystoning problems. A fixed size and axis would ensure no geometric distortion.

== Telop models ==
The Gray Company introduced the original Telop in 1949 (with additional models, later to be known as the Telop I). The dual projector unit offered both transparent and opaque projection. The standard sizes were used for both transparent and card slides, but they could also be made on 35mm film, on 4 in × 3.25 in (102 mm × 83 mm) glass, or on film cards. The third and fourth units on the Telop were attachments with a vertical ticker-tape type roll strip that could be typed on and a horizontal unit similar to a small teleprompter used for title "crawls."

By 1952, when the Telop II was introduced, CBS and NBC were using Telop machines in combination with TV cameras to permit instant fading from one object to another by superimposition. The Telop II was a smaller version of the original model for new TV stations on a budget and featured two openings rather than the original four. At the same time, Gray also developed a Telojector, a gun-turret style slide projector for 2 in × 2 in (51 mm × 51 mm) slides which had two projectors, facilitating easier lap dissolves between the two.

The Telop III was introduced in 1954, was a refinement of the previous makes. Reduced to a single-channel version of the Telop, the Telop III also added a remote-control for switching up to 50 cards and added heat filters for opaque cards. Automation was the emphasis for this model, as was a tie in with the Polaroid Camera Co., in which Polaroid instant photographs could be used in a Telop for on-site use.

== Genericized trademark ==
Because of its popularity, the Telop became a catch-all term for large-format slide projectors and opaque cards, even after the Gray Company stopped manufacturing Telop projectors. The term telop is used in Japan (テロップ, Teroppu) to indicate text superimposed on a screen, such as captions, subtitles, or scrolling tickers.
