= Lower third =

Graphic overlay in lower area of TV screen

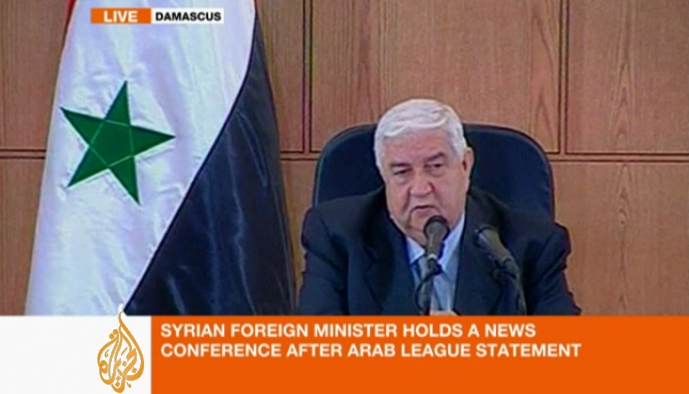
A screenshot of an Al Jazeera English news programme showing Syrian Foreign Minister Walid Muallem in 2011. A lower third at the bottom of the screen identifies him and explains the context of the broadcast.

In the television industry, a lower third (alternatively known as a chyron) is a graphic overlay placed in the title-safe lower area of the screen, though not necessarily the entire lower third of it, as the name suggests.

In its simplest form, a lower third can just be text overlaying the video. Frequently this text is white with a drop shadow to make the words easier to read. A lower third can also contain graphical elements such as boxes, images or shading. Some lower thirds have animated backgrounds and text.

Lower thirds can be created using basic home-video editing software or professional-level equipment. This equipment makes use of video's alpha channel to determine what parts of the graphic or text should be transparent, allowing the video in the background to show through.

== Terminology ==
Lower thirds are also often known as "CG" (from character generator) or captions, and sometimes chyrons in North America, due to the popularity of Chyron Corporation's Chyron I character generator, an early digital solution developed in the 1970s for rendering lower thirds. Other common terms include superbars (or simply supers) (US) and name straps and astons (after Aston Electronic Designs) (UK).

Video with lower thirds is known as a program as broadcast or dirty. Video without lower thirds is known as a clean feed or textless. For international distribution programs often include textless elements on the master tape: these are all the shots that lower thirds and digital on-screen graphics have been applied to, placed end-to-end so engineers can make a clean master if necessary.

== Tiers ==
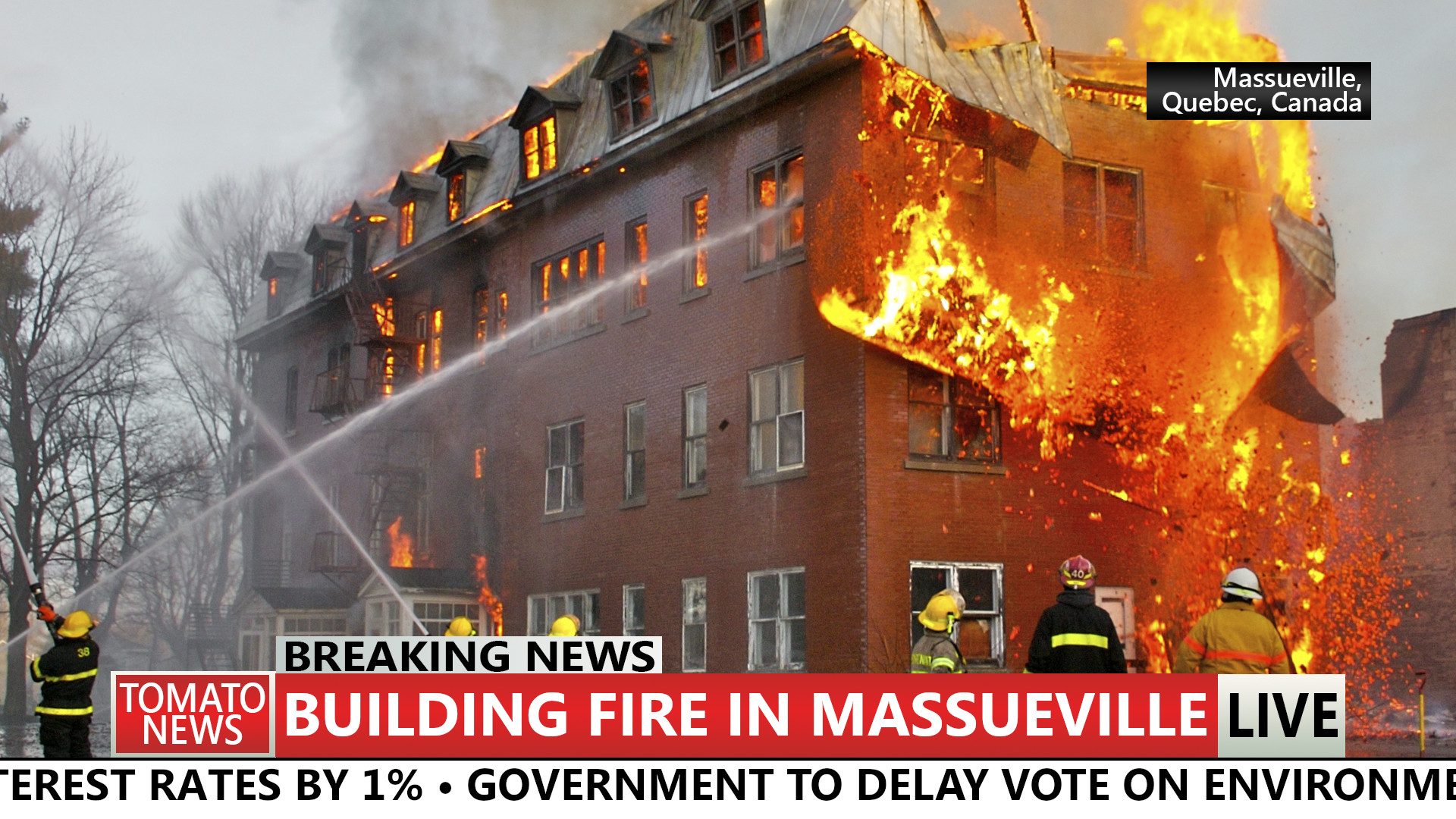
An example of a scrolling news ticker at the bottom of a lower third

Lower thirds are usually arranged in tiers, or lines:

- One-tier lower thirds: Usually used to identify a story that is being shown, or to show a presenter's name.
- Two-tier lower thirds: Used most often to identify a person on screen. Often, the person's name appears on the first line, with their place of residence or a description below that. Two-tier lower thirds may also be used as "locators" to identify where a story is taking place.
- Three-tier lower thirds: These lower thirds add more information. Commonly, the first tier is used to tell when the video was shot, if it was not shot the day the newscast is airing.

=== Further elements ===
Lower thirds increasingly include elements such as news tickers, time and date, weather information, stock quotes, or sports scores.

== See also ==
- Intertitle
- Television news screen layout
- Telop
