= Digital on-screen graphic =

Television station logo used as a watermark

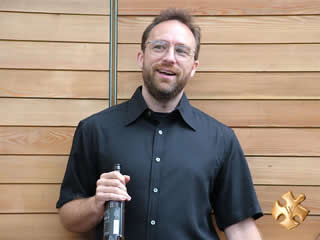
In a typical digital on-screen graphic, the station's logo appears in a corner of the screen (in this simulated example, the bottom-right).

A digital on-screen graphic, digitally originated graphic (DOG, bug, network bug, on-screen bug or screenbug) is a watermark-like station logo that most television broadcasters overlay over a portion of the screen area of their programs to identify the channel. They are thus a form of permanent visual station identification, increasing brand recognition and asserting ownership of the video signal.

The graphic identifies the source of programming, even if it has been time-shifted or recorded. Many of these technologies allow viewers to skip or omit traditional between-programming station identification; thus the use of a DOG enables the station or network to enforce brand identification even when standard commercials are skipped.

DOG watermarking helps to reduce off-the-air copyright infringement—for example, the distribution of a current series' episodes on DVD: the watermarked content is easily differentiated from "official" DVD releases, and can help identify not only the station from which the broadcast was captured, but usually the actual date of the broadcast as well.

Graphics may be used to identify if the correct subscription is being used for a type of venue. For example, showing Sky Sports within a pub in the United Kingdom requires a more expensive subscription; a channel authorized under this subscription adds a pint glass graphic to the bottom of the screen for inspectors to see. The graphic changes at certain times, making it harder to counterfeit.

On the other hand, watermarks pollute the picture, distract viewers' attention and may cover an important piece of information presented in the television program. Extremely bright watermarks may cause screen burn-in or image persistence on some types of television sets such as the now mostly discontinued and rarely used plasma and CRT displays, and currently commonly used OLED and LCD displays.

Usage of visually perceptible embedded watermarks requires the program author to have a separate clean copy for archival purposes, but this practice was not common decades ago when watermarking became popular among broadcasters. Watermarks present an issue when archival videos are used for a documentary that strives to create a coherent story. In some cases, watermarks are blurred or digitally removed if possible to clean up the picture. In the absence of visually perceptible watermarks, content control can be ensured with visually imperceptible digital watermarks.

In some cases, the graphic also shows the name of the current program. Some television networks may place additional logos or text alongside their DOG to advertise significant upcoming programs. For example, broadcasters of the Olympic Games (most notably United States broadcaster NBC) often add the Olympic rings to their DOG for a period of time leading up to and during the Games.

== Connections with sponsor tags ==
Another graphic on television usually connected with sports (particularly in North America, though not in Europe) is the sponsor tag. It shows the logos of certain sponsors, accompanied by some background relevant to the game, the network logo, announcement and music of some kind.

== Usage in ham radio and television ==
In most countries, the ham station is required to periodically identify their amateur-television transmission. Such stations frequently overlay their callsign on the signal instead of placing a card in the background. Most hams use homebuilt devices or old consumer character generators to generate such identifications rather than using graphical superimposes of high cost to do so. Only rarely one can see real graphics, as the callsign is usually written in the "OSD font".

== Live DOGs by hobbyists ==
One of the easiest and most sought-after devices used to generate DOGs by hobbyists is the 1980s vintage Sony XV-T500 video superimposer. This device can luma-key a signal, capture a still frame into memory and then overlay the keyed graphic in one of eight colors onto any CVBS signal. Another method commonly used by hobbyists and even low-budgeted television stations was Amiga computers with genlock interfaces.

== See also ==
- Broadcast designer
- Screen burn-in, a side effect in some cases of digital on-screen graphics
- On-screen display
- Television news screen layout
- Digital watermark
- Score bug, an on-screen graphic specifically for sport broadcasts
- Clock ident
