= List of United States political families (H) =

The following is an alphabetical list of political families in the United States whose last name begins with H.

== Habershams ==
- Joseph Habersham (1751–1815), member of the Georgia Colony Council of Safety, Georgia Colony Councilman, Georgia State Representative 1785, Mayor of Savannah, Georgia 1792–93; Postmaster General of the United States 1795–1801. Brother of John Habersham.
- John Habersham (1754–1799), Delegate to the Confederation Congress from Georgia 1785. Brother of Joseph Habersham.
  - Richard W. Habersham (1786–1842), U.S. Attorney in Georgia, Attorney General of Georgia, U.S. Representative from Georgia 1839–42. Nephew of Joseph Habersham and John Habersham.

== Hagans ==
- Robert E. Hagan (1921–1999) was a Trumbull County, Ohio, commissioner and held a seat in the Ohio House of Representatives.
  - Timothy Hagan (born 1946), his son, was a Cuyahoga County, Ohio, commissioner and 2002 Democratic nominee for Ohio governor.
  - Robert F. Hagan (born 1949), Tim's brother, is a member of the Ohio House of Representatives from the 60th district.

== Hagedorns and Carnahans ==
- Tom Hagedorn (born 1943), U.S. Representative from Minnesota 1975–1983.
  - Jim Hagedorn (born 1962), U.S. Representative from Minnesota 2019–2022. Son of Tom Hagedorn.
  - Jennifer Carnahan (born 1976), Chair of the Minnesota Republican Party 2017–2021. Wife of Jim Hagedorn.

== Haggans ==
- David Haggan, Maine state representative (2016 to 2024), Maine state senator (since 2024)
- Kimberly Haggan, Maine state representative (since 2024). Wife of David Haggan

== Hahns ==
- Gordon Hahn (1919–2001), California Assemblyman 1947–53, Los Angeles Councilman 1953–63. Brother of Kenneth Hahn.
- Kenneth Hahn (1920–1997), Los Angeles, California councilman 1947–52; member of the Los Angeles County, California Board of Supervisors 1952–92; candidate for the Democratic nomination for U.S. Senate from California 1970. Brother of Gordon Hahn.
  - James Hahn (born 1950), Mayor of Los Angeles, California 2001–05, delegate to the Democratic National Convention 2000, Los Angeles City Attorney 1985–2001, Los Angeles City Controller 1981–85. Son of Kenneth Hahn.
  - Janice Hahn (born 1952), candidate for U.S. Representative from California 1998, Los Angeles, California councilwoman 2001–2011; delegate to the Democratic National Convention 2008, U.S. Representative from California 2011–16, Member of the Los Angeles County Board of Supervisors from the 4th district since 2016. Daughter of Kenneth Hahn.

== Haights and Huntsmans ==
- David B. Haight (1906–2004), Mayor of Palo Alto, California 1961–63. Grandfather of Jon Huntsman Jr.
  - Jon Huntsman Jr. (born 1960), U.S. Ambassador to Singapore 1992–93, Governor of Utah 2005–09, delegate to the Republican National Convention 2004, U.S. Ambassador to China 2009–11, U.S. Ambassador to Russia 2017–19. Grandson of David B. Haight.

== Hailes ==
- William Haile (1807–1876), New Hampshire State Senator 1854–56, Governor of New Hampshire 1857–59, delegate to the Republican National Convention 1860. Father of William Henry Haile.
  - William Henry Haile, Lieutenant Governor of Massachusetts 1890–93, candidate for Governor of Massachusetts 1892. Son of William Haile.

== Haileys ==
- John Hailey (1835–1921), U.S. Congressional Delegate from Idaho Territory 1873–75 1885–87. Father of Thomas G. Hailey.
  - Thomas G. Hailey (1865–1908), District Attorney in Oregon, Mayor of Pendleton, Oregon; Justice of the Oregon Supreme Court 1905–07. Son of John Hailey.

== Haines and Ogdens ==
- Aaron Ogden (1756–1839), Clerk of Essex County, New Jersey 1785–93; U.S. Senator from New Jersey 1801–03; New Jersey Assemblyman 1803–12; Governor of New Jersey 1812–13; Collector of Customs of Jersey City, New Jersey 1830–39. Granduncle of Daniel Haines.
  - Elias B. D. Ogden (1800–1865) Associate Justice of the New Jersey Supreme Court 1848–65. Son of Aaron Ogden.
    - Frederick B. Ogden (1827–1893) 8th Mayor of Hoboken, New Jersey 1865–67. Grandson of Aaron Ogden and son of Elias B. D. Ogden.
    - Daniel Haines (1801–1877), New Jersey State Senator, Governor of New Jersey 1843–45 1848–51, Justice of the New Jersey Supreme Court. Grandnephew of Aaron Ogden.

== Halls ==
- William Augustus Hall (1815–1888), Circuit Court Judge in Missouri 1847–61, delegate to the Missouri Constitutional Convention 1861, U.S. Representative from Missouri 1861–65, delegate to the Democratic National Convention 1864. Brother of Willard Preble Hall.
- Willard Preble Hall (1820–1882), Attorney of Sparta, Missouri; U.S. Representative from Missouri 1847–53; candidate for U.S. Senate from Missouri 1856; Lieutenant Governor of Missouri 1861–64; Governor of Missouri 1864–65. Brother of William Augustus Hall.
  - Uriel Sebree Hall (1852–1932), U.S. Representative from Missouri 1893–97. Son of William Augustus Hall.

NOTE: Willard Preble Hall was also son-in-law of U.S. Representative Mordecai Oliver.

== Halls of Delaware ==
- David Hall Sr., Justice of the Peace in Delaware Colony, Delaware Colony Assemblyman. Father of David Hall.
  - David Hall (1752–1817), candidate for Governor of Delaware 1798, Governor of Delaware 1802–1805, candidate for U.S. Representative from Delaware 1812, Judge of the Sussex County Court of Common Pleas 1813–1817. Son of David Hall Sr.
    - John Collins (1776–1822), Governor of Delaware 1821–1822. Son-in-law of David Hall.
      - Bethany Hall-Long (born 1963), Delaware State Representative 2003–2009, Delaware State Senator 2009–2017, Lieutenant Governor of Delaware 2017–present. Descendant of David Hall.

NOTE: John Collins was also son Delaware Assemblyman John Collins Sr. and brother-in-law of Delaware Governor David Hazzard.

== Halls of Georgia and Illinois ==
- Lyman Hall (1724–1790), Delegate to the Continental Congress from Georgia 1775, Governor of Georgia 1783. Ancestor of Homer W. Hall.
  - Homer W. Hall (1870–1954), Probate Court Judge in Illinois 1909–14, delegate to the Republican National Convention 1916 1936, U.S. Representative from Illinois 1927–33. Descendant of Lyman Hall.

== Halls of Hempstead, New York ==
- Wayne J. Hall, Sr, Trustee for the Village of Hempstead (village), New York, Mayor of Hempstead (village), New York 2005–current. Youth activist, Father of Wayne Hall Jr.
  - Wayne Hall, Jr, Chairman of New Hempstead Democratic Club, member of Renew Hempstead, Son of Mayor Wayne Hall.

== Halls of Ohio ==
- Dave Hall, Commissioner of Dayton, Ohio 1963–65; Mayor of Dayton, Ohio 1965–70. Father of Sam Hall and Tony P. Hall.
  - Sam Hall (1937–2014), Ohio State Representative. Son of Dave Hall.
  - Tony P. Hall (born 1942), Ohio State Representative 1969–73, Ohio State Senator 1973–79, candidate for Ohio Secretary of State 1974, U.S. Representative from Ohio 1979–2003, U.S. Ambassador to the United Nations Agencies for Food and Agriculture 2002–2006. Son of Dave Hall.

== Halls and Lewis ==
- Bolling Hall (1767–1836), Georgia State Representative 1800–02 1804–06, U.S. Representative from Georgia 1811–17. Uncle of Dixon H. Lewis.
  - Dixon H. Lewis (1802–1848), Alabama State Representative 1826, U.S. Representative from Alabama 1829–44, U.S. Senator from Alabama 1844–48. Nephew of Bolling Hall.

NOTE: Dixon H. Lewis was also son-in-law of South Carolina and Alabama legislator John Archer Elmore and brother-in-law of U.S. Senator Franklin Harper Elmore, Kansas Territory Supreme Court Justice Rush Elmore, South Carolina Treasurer Benjamin F. Elmore, and Alabama Secretary of State Albert S. Elmore.

== Halls and Woodruffs ==
- De Vere Hall, Michigan Republican Central Committeeman 1907. Father-in-law of Roy O. Woodruff.
  - Roy O. Woodruff (1876–1953), Mayor of Bay City, Michigan 1911–13; U.S. Representative from Michigan 1913–15 1921–53. Son-in-law of De Vere Hall.

== Halperns and Solarzes ==
- Ralph Halpern (1890–1975), New York Assemblyman 1920–21, candidate for New York Assembly 1922, delegate to the Republican National Convention 1932 1940 1972, New York Republican Committeeman 1936 1961. Secretary of Queens Republican Committee. Father of Seymour Halpern.
  - Seymour Halpern (1913–1997), New York State Senator 1941–54, candidate for U.S. Representative from New York 1954, U.S. Representative from New York 1959–73. Son of Ralph Halpern.
    - Stephen J. Solarz (1940–2010), New York Assemblyman 1969–74, delegate to the Democratic National Mid-Term Convention 1974, U.S. Representative from New York 1975–93. First cousin once removed of Seymour Halpern.
    - Nina Solarz, delegate to the Democratic National Convention 1984. Wife of Stephen J. Solarz.

== Halseys ==
- Silas Halsey (1743–1832), Sheriff of Suffolk County, New York 1787–92; Supervisor of Ovid, New York 1794–1804; New York Assemblyman 1797–98 1800–01 1803–04; delegate to the New York Constitutional Convention 1801; Clerk of Seneca County, New York 1804–13 1815; U.S. Representative from New York 1805–07; New York State Senator 1808–09. Father of Nicoll Halsey and Jehiel H. Halsey.
  - Nicoll Halsey (1782–1865), Supervisor of Ulysses, New York 1812 1814–15 1818 1821 1826; New York Assemblyman 1816 1824; Sheriff of Tompkins County, New York 1819–21; U.S. Representative from New York 1833–35; Judge in Tompkins County, New York. Son of Silas Halsey.
  - Jehiel H. Halsey (1788–1867), Clerk of Seneca County, New York 1819–21; U.S. Representative from New York 1829–31; New York State Senator 1832–35; Supervisor of Lodi, New York 1845–46. Son of Silas Halsey.

== Hamers ==
- Thomas Lyon Hamer (1800–1846), Ohio State Representative 1825 1828–29, U.S. Representative from Ohio 1833–39. Uncle of Thomas R. Hamer.
  - Thomas R. Hamer (1864–1950), Idaho State Representative 1896, Governor of Cebu, Justice of the Philippines Supreme Court, delegate to the Idaho Republican Convention 1908 1912, U.S. Representative from Idaho 1909–11. Nephew of Thomas Lyon Hamer.

== Hamiltons ==
- Morgan C. Hamilton (1809–1893), Texas Republic Secretary of War and Marine 1842–43 1844–1945, delegate to the Texas Constitutional Convention 1868 1869, U.S. Senator from Texas 1870–77. Brother of Andrew Jackson Hamilton.
- Andrew Jackson Hamilton (1815–1875), Attorney General of Texas 1850, U.S. Representative from Texas 1859–61, Governor of Texas 1865–66, Justice of the Texas Supreme Court 1866, delegate to the Republican National Convention 1868, Republican National Committeeman 1868–70. Brother of Morgan C. Hamilton.

== Hamiltons of Indiana ==
- Lee H. Hamilton (born 1931), U.S. Representative from Indiana 1965–99.
  - David Hamilton (born 1957), Judge of the United States District Court for the Southern District of Indiana 1994–2009, Judge of the United States Court of Appeals for the Seventh Circuit 2009–present. Nephew of Lee H. Hamilton.
  - John Hamilton, Mayor of Bloomington, Indiana. Brother of David Hamilton.
  - Dawn Johnsen (born 1961), Acting Assistant Attorney General for the Office of Legal Counsel 1997–98. Wife of John Hamilton.

== Hamlins ==
- Stephen Emery, Attorney General of Maine 1839–40. Father-in-law of Hannibal Hamlin.
  - Elijah L. Hamlin (1799–1872), candidate for Governor of Maine 1848 1849, Mayor of Bangor, Maine 1851–52. Brother of Hannibal Hamlin.
  - Hannibal Hamlin (1809–1891), Maine State Representative 1836–40 1847, U.S. Representative from Maine 1843–47, U.S. Senator from Maine 1848–57 1857–61 1869–81, Governor of Maine 1857, Vice President of the United States 1861–65, candidate for Republican nomination for Vice President of the United States 1868, U.S. Minister to Spain 1881–82. Brother of Elijah L. Hamlin.
    - A.C. Hamlin (1829–1905), Mayor of Bangor, Maine 1877–78. Son of Elijah L. Hamlin.
    - Charles Hamlin (1837–1911), Maine State Representative 1883–87. Son of Hannibal Hamlin.
    - Hannibal E. Hamlin (1858–1938), Maine State Representative 1893–95, Maine State Senator 1899–1901, Attorney General of Maine 1905–08, delegate to the Democratic National Convention 1924. Son of Hannibal Hamlin.

NOTE: Hannibal Hamlin's son, Cyrus, was also a political figure in Louisiana.

== Hamms and Van Hornes ==
- Isaac Van Horne (1754–1834), Pennsylvania State Representative 1796–97, U.S. Representative from Pennsylvania 1801–05, Receiver of the Land Office of Zanesville, Ohio 1805–26; Adjutant General of Ohio 1810–11 1812–18. Father of Bernard Van Horne.
  - Bernard Van Horne, Receiver of the Land Office of Zanesville, Ohio. Son of Isaac Van Horne.
  - John E. Hamm (1776–1864), Ohio State Representative 1812–13, Ohio State Senator 1827–31, U.S. Chargé d'Affaires to Chile, Mayor of Zanesville, Ohio; candidate for U.S. Representative from Ohio 1836. Son-in-law of Isaac Van Horne.

== Hammonds, Hamptons and Prestons ==
- Wade Hampton I (1752–1835), member of the Virginia Legislature 1782–92, U.S. Representative from South Carolina 1795–97 1803–05. Father-in-law of James Henry Hammond and John S. Preston.
  - James Henry Hammond (1807–1864), U.S. Representative from South Carolina 1835–36, Governor of South Carolina 1842–44, U.S. Senator from South Carolina 1857–60. Son-in-law of Wade Hampton I.
  - John S. Preston (1809–1881), delegate to the Democratic National Convention 1860. Son-in-law of Wade Hampton I.
  - Wade Hampton III (1818–1902), South Carolina State Senator 1858, candidate for Governor of South Carolina 1865, Governor of South Carolina 1876–79, U.S. Senator from South Carolina 1879–91. Grandson of Wade Hampton I. Wade Hampton III was also son-in-law of U.S. Senator George McDuffie and U.S. Representative Francis Preston and brother-in-law of U.S. Senator William Campbell Preston.

== Hancocks ==
- Franklin Wills Hancock Jr. (1894–1969), North Carolina State Senator 1926–28, North Carolina State Representative 1928–30, U.S. Representative from North Carolina 1930–39, candidate for U.S. Senate from North Carolina 1938, delegate to the Democratic National Convention 1940, North Carolina State Court Judge 1950. Father of Wills Hancock III.
  - Wills Hancock III (born 1918), North Carolina State Representative 1947–48, North Carolina State Senator 1951–52 1955–56 1959. Son of Franklin Wills Hancock Jr.
    - Richard H. Moore (born 1960), North Carolina State Representative 1993–95, North Carolina State Treasurer 2001–09. Grandson of Franklin Wills Hancock Jr.

== Hancocks and Merriams ==
- Winfield Scott Hancock (1824–1886), candidate for Democratic nomination for President of the United States 1868 1876, candidate for President of the United States 1880. Brother-in-law of John L. Merriam.
- John L. Merriam, Minnesota State Representative 1870–71. Brother-in-law of Winfield Scott Hancock.
  - William R. Merriam (1849–1931), Minnesota State Representative 1883 1887, Governor of Minnesota 1889–93, delegate to the Republican National Convention 1896. Son of John L. Merriam.

== Hancocks and Quincys ==
- Edmund Quincy (1703–1788), Justice in Massachusetts. Father-in-law of John Hancock.
- Thomas Hancock, Boston, Massachusetts Selectman. Uncle and adoptive father of John Hancock.
  - John Hancock (1737–1793), Boston, Massachusetts Selectman; member of the Massachusetts Bay Colony General Court; Massachusetts Bay Colony Representative; President of the Continental Congress 1775–77 1785–86; Governor of Massachusetts 1780–85 1787–93. Nephew and adoptive son of Thomas Hancock.

== Hands ==
- Augustus C. Hand (1803–1878), U.S. Representative from New York 1839–41, New York State Senator, Justice of the New York Supreme Court 1847–55, delegate to the Democratic National Convention 1868. Father of Richard Lockhart Hand.
  - Matthew Hale (1829–1897), New York State Senator 1868–69. Son-in-law of Augustus C. Hand.
    - Matthew Hale, member of the Boston City Council 1909 to 1911, delegate-at-large to the Massachusetts Constitutional Convention 1917, national chairman of the Progressive Party 1917. Son of Matthew Hale.
  - Samuel Hand (1834–1886), Associate Judge of the New York Court of Appeals 1878. Son of Augustus C. Hand, father of Learned Hand.
  - Richard Lockhart Hand, candidate for Justice of the New York Supreme Court 1885 1893. Son of Augustus C. Hand.
    - Augustus Noble Hand (1869–1954), U.S. District Court Judge in New York 1914–27, Judge of the U.S. Court of Appeals 1927–53. Son of Richard Lockhart Hand.
    - Learned Hand (1872–1961), U.S. District Court Judge in New York 1909–24, Judge of the U.S. Court of Appeals 1924–61. Cousin of Augustus Noble Hand.

== Hansens ==
- Orval H. Hansen (1926–2017), Idaho State Representative, candidate for U.S. Representative from Idaho 1962, Idaho State Senator, U.S. Representative from Idaho 1969–75. Father of Jim D. Hansen.
  - Jim D. Hansen (born 1959), member of the Idaho Legislature 1989–94, candidate for U.S. Representative from Idaho 2006. Son of Orval H. Hansen.

== Hansens and Meads ==
- Clifford P. Hansen (1912–2009), delegate to the Republican National Convention 1960, Governor of Wyoming 1963–67, U.S. Senator from Wyoming 1967–78. Father of Mary Hansen Mead.
  - Mary Hansen Mead (1935–1996), candidate for Governor of Wyoming 1990. Daughter of Clifford P. Hansen.
    - Matthew H. Mead (born 1962), U.S. Attorney of Cheyenne, Wyoming 2001–07; candidate for Republican nomination for U.S. Senate from Wyoming 2007, Governor of Wyoming 2011–2019. Son of Mary Hansen Mead.
    - Katherine L. Mead, candidate for Wyoming State Representative 2006. Daughter-in-law of Mary Hansen Mead.

== Hansons ==
- John Hanson (1721–1783), Maryland State Delegate 1777–1781, Delegate to the Second Continental Congress 1780–1782, President of the Continental Congress 1781–1782.
  - Alexander Contee Hanson Sr. (1749–1806), Chancellor of Maryland 1789–1806. Son of John Hanson.
    - Alexander Contee Hanson Jr. (1786–1819), U.S. Representative from Maryland 1813–1816, U.S. Senator from Maryland 1816–1819. Son of Alexander Contee Hanson Sr., Grandson of John Hanson.

== Hannas ==
- Joseph Hanna (1772–1849), Indiana State Representative 1820–21. Brother of Robert Hanna and David Graem Hanna.
- Robert Hanna (1786–1858), delegate to the Indiana Constitutional Convention 1816, U.S. Senator from Indiana 1831–32, Indiana State Representative 1832–33 1836–39, Indiana State Senator 1842–46. Brother of Joseph Hanna and David Graem Hanna.
- David Graem Hanna (1789–1869), Indiana State Representative 1844–45. Brother of Joseph Hanna and Robert Hanna.
  - Albert G. Hanna (1807–1879), Indiana State Representative 1836–37 1846–47 1851–52, candidate for Indiana State Representative 1850. Son of Joseph Hanna.
  - James McLean Hanna (1816–1872), candidate for Indiana State Representative 1847, Indiana State Senator 1849–52 1869, Circuit Court Judge in Indiana 1856–57, Justice of the Indiana Supreme Court 1857–65, delegate to the Democratic National Convention 1864. Son of David Graem Hanna.

== Hannas, Harrises and McAllisters ==
- John Andre Hanna (1762–1805), delegate to the Pennsylvania Constitutional Convention 1787, Pennsylvania State Representative 1791, U.S. Representative from Pennsylvania 1791–1805. Husband of Mary Harris, daughter of John Harris Jr., Founder of Harrisburg, Pennsylvania. Grandfather of Archibald McAllister.
- Mary Harris Hanna (1 October 1770-), wife of John Andre Hanna, daughter of John Harris Jr., Founder of Harris' Ferry, later known as Harrisburg, Pennsylvania.
  - Archibald McAllister (1813–1883), U.S. Representative from Pennsylvania 1863–65. Grandson of John Andre Hanna and Mary Harris Hanna.

== Hannas, McCormicks, and Simms ==
- Mark Hanna (1837–1904), Chairman of the Republican National Committee 1896–1904, U.S. Senator from Ohio 1897–1904. Father of Ruth Hanna McCormick.
  - Ruth Hanna McCormick (1880–1944), member of the Republican National Committee 1919–24, U.S. Representative from Illinois 1929–31, candidate for U.S. Senate from Illinois 1930.
  - Joseph M. McCormick (1877–1925), Illinois State Representative 1912 1914, U.S. Representative from Illinois 1917–19, U.S. Senator from Illinois 1919–25. Husband of Ruth Hanna McCormick.
  - Albert G. Simms (1882–1964), Albuquerque, New Mexico Councilman 1920–22; Chairman of Bernalillo County, New Mexico 1920–22; New Mexico State Representative 1925–27; U.S. Representative from New Mexico 1929–31; member of the Republican National Committee 1932–34. Husband of Ruth Hanna McCormick.

NOTE: Joseph M. McCormick was also grandson of Chicago, Illinois Mayor Joseph Medill. His first cousin twice removed, Joseph, is also husband of U.S. Secretary of State Madeleine Albright, McCormick was also son of U.S. Ambassador Robert Sanderson McCormick, first cousin of Illinois State Representative Joseph Medill Patterson and first cousin once removed of U.S. Ambassador William McCormick Blair Jr.

== Hardins ==
- Martin D. Hardin (1780–1823), Kentucky State Representative 1805–06 1812 1818–20, Kentucky Secretary of State 1812–16, U.S. Senator from Kentucky 1816–17. Cousin of Benjamin Hardin.
- Benjamin Hardin (1784–1852), Kentucky State Representative 1810–11 1824–25, Kentucky State Senator 1828–32, U.S. Representative from Kentucky 1815–17 1819–23 1833–37, Kentucky Secretary of State 1844–47, delegate to the Kentucky Constitutional Convention 1849. Cousin of Martin D. Hardin.
  - John J. Hardin (1810–1847), Prosecuting Attorney of Morgan County, Illinois; Illinois State Representative 1836–42; U.S. Representative from Illinois 1843–45. Son of Martin D. Hardin.

== Hardys and the Peatrosses ==
- George W. Hardy Jr. (1900–1967), mayor of Shreveport, Louisiana, 1932–34; judge of the Louisiana Court of Appeal for the Second Circuit
- Charles B. Peatross (1940–2015), member of the Shreveport City Council, 1978–82; judge of the Louisiana Court of Appeal for the Second Circuit in Shreveport, 1996–2011, nephew of George W. Hardy Jr.

== Hares ==
- Raymond A. Hare (1901–1994), U.S. Vice Consul in Paris, France 1932; U.S. Consul in Cairo, Egypt 1943; U.S. Ambassador to Saudi Arabia 1950–53; U.S. Minister to Yemen 1950–53 1959–60; U.S. Ambassador to Lebanon 1953–54; U.S. Ambassador to Egypt 1956–58; U.S. Ambassador to the United Arab Republic 1958–59; U.S. Ambassador to Turkey 1961–65. Father of Paul Julian Hare.
  - Paul Julian Hare (born 1937), U.S. Ambassador to Zambia 1985–88. Son of Raymond A. Hare.

== Hares of South Carolina ==
- Butler B. Hare (1875–1967), U.S. Representative from South Carolina 1925–33 1939–47. Father of James Butler Hare.
  - James Butler Hare (1918–1966), U.S. Representative from South Carolina 1949–51. Son of Butler B. Hare.

== Harlans ==
- James Harlan (1800–1863), U.S. Representative from Kentucky, 1835–39; Kentucky state attorney general, 1849–59.
  - John Marshall Harlan (1833–1911), U.S. District Attorney for Kentucky, 1861–63; Kentucty state attorney general, 1861–65; Associate Justice of the U.S. Supreme Court, 1877–1911; son of James Harlan.
    - John Marshall Harlan II (1899–1971), justice of 2nd Circuit Court of Appeals, 1954–55; Associate Justice of the Supreme Court, 1955–71; grandson of John Marshall Harlan.

== Harlans of Indiana and Ohio ==
- Aaron Harlan (1802–1868), Ohio State Representative 1832–33, Ohio State Senator 1838–39 1849, delegate to the Ohio Constitutional Convention 1850, U.S. Representative from Ohio 1853–59, candidate for U.S. Representative from Ohio 1861. Cousin of Andrew J. Harlan.
- Andrew J. Harlan (1815–1907), Indiana State Representative 1846–48, U.S. Representative from Indiana 1849–51 1853–55, Dakota Territory Representative 1861, Missouri State Representative 1864–68, Postmaster of Wakeeney, Kansas 1890–94. Cousin of Aaron Harlan.

== Harlans and Lincolns ==
- James Harlan (1820–1899), U.S. Senator from Iowa 1855–65 1867–73, U.S. Secretary of the Interior 1866–67, Judge of the Court of Commissioners of Alabama Claims 1882–85. Father-in-law of Robert Todd Lincoln.
  - Robert Todd Lincoln (1843–1926), U.S. Secretary of War 1881–85, U.S. Ambassador to the United Kingdom 1889–93. Son-in-law of James Harlan.

NOTE: Robert Todd Lincoln was also son of U.S. President Abraham Lincoln.

== Harlans and Semblers ==
- Byron B. Harlan (1886–1949), U.S. Representative from Ohio 1931–39, delegate to the Democratic National Convention 1940, U.S. Attorney in Ohio 1944–46, Judge of the U.S. Tax Court 1946–49. Great-grandfather of Charles W. Sembler II.
  - Charles W. Sembler II (born 1965), Florida State Representative.

== Harpers ==
- James Harper (1795–1869), Mayor of New York City 1844–45. Father of Philip J.A. Harper.
  - Philip J.A. Harper (1824–1896), President of Hempstead, New York. Son of James Harper.

== Harrimans ==
- E.H. Harriman (1848–1909), delegate to the Republican National Convention 1904. W. Averell Harriman.
  - W. Averell Harriman (1891–1986), U.S. Ambassador to the Soviet Union 1943–46, U.S. Ambassador to Great Britain 1946 1961 1965–69, U.S. Secretary of Commerce 1946–48, candidate for the Democratic nomination for President of the United States 1952 1956, delegate to the Democratic National Convention 1952 1956 1960 1964, Governor of New York 1955–59. Son of E.H. Harriman.
  - Pamela Harriman (1920–1997), U.S. Ambassador to France 1993–97. Wife of W. Averell Harriman.

NOTE: Pamela Harriman was also previously married to British politician Randolph Churchill, son of British Prime Minister Winston Churchill, and was widow of Leland Hayward, grandson of U.S. Senator Monroe L. Hayward.

== Harringtons ==
- Joseph B. Harrington, Mayor of Salem, Massachusetts 1948–49. Father of Michael J. Harrington.
  - Michael J. Harrington (born 1936), Member of the U.S. House of Representatives from Massachusetts's 6th district 1969–79. Son of Joseph B. Harrington, cousin of Kevin B. Harrington.
  - Kevin B. Harrington (1929–2008), Massachusetts State Senator 1959–78, President of the Massachusetts Senate 1971–78. Father of Neil J. Harrington, cousin of Michael J. Harrington.
    - Neil J. Harrington, Mayor of Salem, Massachusetts 1990–97. Son of Kevin B. Harrington.

== Harris ==
- William A. Harris (1805–1864), Virginia House Delegate 1830–31, U.S. Representative from Virginia 1841–43, Charge D'Affaires to Argentine Republic 1846–51. Father of William A. Harris.
  - William A. Harris (1841–1909), U.S. Representative from Kansas 1893–95, Kansas State Senator 1895–96, U.S. Senator from Kansas 1897–1903, candidate for Governor of Kansas 1906. Son of William A. Harris.

== Harris of Pennsylvania and New York ==
- John Harris (1760–1824), U.S. Representative from New York 1807–09. Cousin of Robert Harris.
- Robert Harris (1768–1851), U.S. Representative from Pennsylvania 1823–27. Cousin of John Harris.

== Harris and Hills ==
- John Hill (1800–1880), U.S. Representative from Virginia 1839–41, Virginia State Court Judge 1870. Cousin of John T. Harris.
- John T. Harris (1823–1899), U.S. Representative from Virginia 1859–61 1871–81, member of the Virginia Legislature 1863, Virginia State Court Judge 1866. Cousin of John Hill.

== Harris and Hooks ==
- Charles Hooks (1768–1843), member of the North Carolina House of Commons 1801–05, North Carolina State Senator 1810–11, U.S. Representative from North Carolina 1816–17 1819–25. Great-grandfather of William J. Harris.
  - William J. Harris (1868–1932), Georgia State Senator 1911–12, U.S. Senator from Georgia 1919–32. Great-grandson of Charles Hooks.

== Harris and Howards ==
- Elisha Harris (1791–1861), Lieutenant Governor of Rhode Island 1846–47, Governor of Rhode Island 1847–49. Father-in-law of Henry Howard.
  - Henry Howard (1826–1905), Governor of Rhode Island 1873–75. Son-in-law of Elisha Harris.

== Harris and Rathbones ==
- Ira Harris (1802–1875), New York Assemblyman 1845–46, delegate to the New York Constitutional Convention 1846, New York State Senator 1847, Justice of the New York Supreme Court 1847–59, U.S. Senator from New York 1861–67. Stepfather and father-in-law of Henry Rathbone.
  - Henry Rathbone (1837–1911), U.S. Consul to Hanover, Germany. Stepson and son-in-law of Ira Harris.
    - Henry Riggs Rathbone (1870–1928), delegate to the Republican National Convention 1916, U.S. Representative from Illinois 1923–28. Son of Henry Rathbone.

== Harris, Haynes, and Taylors ==
- William Blount Carter (1792–1848), U.S. Representative from Tennessee 1835–41. Uncle of Nathaniel Green Taylor.
  - Landon Carter Haynes (1816–1875), Tennessee state representative 1845, 1849, state senator 1847, Senator (Confederate Congress) 1862–65. Brother-in-law of Nathaniel Green Taylor, uncle of Alfred A. Taylor, Robert L. Taylor, and Nathaniel Edwin Harris.
  - Nathaniel Green Taylor (1819–1887), U.S. Representative from Tennessee 1854–55 1866–67. Father of Alfred A. Taylor and Robert L. Taylor.
    - Alfred A. Taylor (1848–1931), member of the Tennessee Legislature 1875, U.S. Representative from Tennessee 1889–95, Governor of Tennessee 1921–23. Son of Nathaniel Green Taylor.
    - Robert Love Taylor (1850–1912), U.S. Representative from Tennessee 1879–81, Governor of Tennessee 1887–91 1897–99, U.S. Senator from Tennessee 1907–12. Son of Nathaniel Green Taylor.
    - Nathaniel Edwin Harris (1846–1929), Governor of Georgia 1915–17. First cousin of Alfred A. Taylor and Robert L. Taylor.
      - Hillsman Taylor (1884–1965), Speaker of the Tennessee House of Representatives 1909–11. Son-in-law of Robert Love Taylor.
      - Robert Love Taylor (1899–1987), Judge of the United States District Court for the Eastern District of Tennessee 1949–84. Son of Alfred A. Taylor.

NOTE: Alfred and Robert Taylor were opposing candidates for Governor in 1888.

== Harrisons ==
- Benjamin Harrison III (1673–1710) Virginia attorney general, treasurer, and Speaker of the House of Burgesses. Father of Benjamin Harrison IV.
  - Benjamin Harrison IV (1693–1745) Member of the Virginia House of Burgesses. Father of Benjamin Harrison V and Carter Henry Harrison I
    - Peyton Randolph (1721–1775), Delegate to the Continental Congress from Virginia 1774–75. Brother-in-law of Benjamin Harrison.
    - Benjamin Harrison V (1726–1791), Delegate to the Continental Congress from Virginia 1774, member of the Virginia Legislature 1776 and signed the Declaration of Independence, Governor of Virginia 1782–84. Brother-in-law of Peyton Randolph.
    - Carter Henry Harrison I (1736 – 1793), Member of Virginia House of Delegates.
    - John Cleves Symmes (1742–1814), Justice of the New Jersey Supreme Court 1777–87, Delegate to the Continental Congress from New Jersey 1785–86, Justice of the Northwest Territory Supreme Court 1788–1802. Father-in-law of William Henry Harrison.
      - Carter Bassett Harrison (1752–1808), member of the Virginia Legislature, U.S. Representative from Virginia 1793–99. Son of Benjamin Harrison V.
      - Edmund Jennings Randolph (1753–1813), delegate to the Virginia Constitutional Convention 1776, Attorney General of Virginia 1776–82, Delegate to the Continental Congress from Virginia 1779–82, Governor of Virginia 1786–88, Virginia House Delegate 1788, Attorney General of the United States 1789–94, U.S. Secretary of State 1794–95. Nephew of Peyton Randolph.
      - Beverley Randolph (1754–1797), Governor of Virginia 1788–91. Nephew of Benjamin Harrison V.
      - Benjamin Harrison VI (1755–1799), Virginia House of Delegates 1774–75. Son of Benjamin Harrison V.
      - Burwell Bassett (1764–1841), Virginia House Delegate 1787–89 1819–21, Virginia State Senator 1794–1805, U.S. Representative from Virginia 1805–13 1815–19 1821–29. First cousin of William Henry Harrison.
      - William Henry Harrison (1773–1841), Secretary of the Northwest Territory 1798–99, U.S. Congressional Delegate from the Northwest Territory 1799–1800, Governor of Indiana Territory 1801–12, U.S. Representative from Ohio 1816–19, Ohio State Senator 1819–21, candidate for Governor of Ohio 1820, U.S. Senator from Ohio 1825–28, U.S. Minister to Gran Colombia 1828–29, candidate for President of the United States 1836, President of the United States 1841. Son of Benjamin Harrison V.
        - John Scott Harrison (1804–1878), U.S. Representative from Ohio 1853–57. Son of William Henry Harrison.
        - Carter Harrison III (1825–1893), U.S. Representative from Illinois 1875–79, Mayor of Chicago, Illinois 1879–87 1893; candidate for Governor of Illinois 1884. Grandnephew of Benjamin Harrison V.
          - Carter Harrison IV (1860–1953), Mayor of Chicago, Illinois 1897–1905 1911–1915: delegate to the Democratic National Convention 1916 1920 1932 1936. Son of Carter Harrison Sr.
          - Alvin Saunders (1817–1899), delegate to the Iowa Constitutional Convention 1846, Iowa State Senator 1854–56 1858–60, delegate to the Republican National Convention 1860 1868, Governor of Nebraska Territory 1861–67, U.S. Senator from Nebraska 1877–83. Grandfather of William H. Harrison.
          - Benjamin Harrison (1833–1901), candidate for Governor of Indiana 1876, U.S. Senator from Indiana 1881–87, President of the United States 1889–93. Son of John Scott Harrison.
            - Russell Benjamin Harrison (1854–1936), Indiana State Representative 1921–25, Indiana State Senator 1925–33, son of President Benjamin Harrison, father of U.S. Representative William H. Harrison of Wyoming, son-in-law of Alvin Saunders.
            - William Henry Harrison III (1896–1990), Indiana State Representative 1927–29, Wyoming State Representative 1845–50, U.S. Representative from Wyoming 1951–55 1961–65 1967–69, candidate for U.S. Senate from Wyoming 1954. Grandson of Alvin Saunders and Benjamin Harrison, son of Russell Benjamin Harrison.
            - Albertis Harrison (1907–1995), Virginia State Senator 1947–57, Attorney General of Virginia 1957–61, Governor of Virginia 1962–66, Justice of the Virginia Supreme Court 1968–81. Distant relative of Benjamin Harrison V.

NOTE: William Henry Harrison was also fourth cousin once removed of U.S. President John Tyler and fifth cousin of U.S. President Abraham Lincoln. John Cleves Symmes was also nephew by marriage of New York Assemblyman Peter V.B. Livingston and Congressional Delegate Philip Livingston, son-in-law of Congressional Delegate William Livingston, first cousin by marriage of New York Assemblyman Peter R. Livingston, Congressional Delegate Walter Livingston, and New York State Senator Philip Livingston; and brother-in-law of Congressional Delegate John Jay and U.S. Supreme Court Justice Brockholst Livingston.

== Harrisons of Virginia ==
- Thomas W. Harrison (1856–1935), Virginia State Senator 1887–94, Virginia State Court Judge 1895–1916, delegate to the Virginia Constitutional Convention 1901 1902, U.S. Representative from Virginia 1916–22 1923–29. Father of Burr Harrison.
  - Burr Harrison (1904–1973), Virginia State Senator 1940–42, Circuit Court Judge in Virginia 1942–46, U.S. Representative from Virginia 1946–63. Son of Thomas W. Harrison.

== Harrisons and Reids ==
- Whitelaw Reid (1837–1912), U.S. Minister to France 1889–92, candidate for Vice President of the United States 1892, U.S. Ambassador to Great Britain 1905–12. Uncle by marriage of Ralph C. Harrison.
  - Ralph C. Harrison (1831–1918), Justice of the California Supreme Court 1891–1903, Judge of the California Court of Appeals 1905–08. Nephew by marriage of Whitelaw Reid.
    - Ogden Rogers Reid (1925–2019), U.S. Ambassador to Israel 1959–61, U.S. Representative from New York 1963–75, candidate for Democratic nomination for Governor of New York 1974, candidate for Executive of Westchester County, New York 1983. Grandson of Whitelaw Reid.

== Harts and Kings ==
- Horatio King (1811–1897), Postmaster General of the United States 1861. Father of Horatio Collins King.
  - Horatio Collins King (1837–1918), New York Secretary of State 1895, candidate for U.S. Representative from New York 1897, candidate for Comptroller of New York 1912. Son of Horatio King.
    - Merwin K. Hart (1881–1962), New York Assemblyman 1907–08. Grandson-in-law of Horatio Collins King.

NOTE: Merwin K. Hart was also great-great-grandson of New York Assemblyman Thomas Hart, great-grandson of New York State Senator Ephraim Hart, great-grandnephew of New York State Senator Truman Hart, and grandnephew of New York Assemblyman Henry R. Hart.

== Harters and Moores ==
- Robert Moore (1778–1831), Treasurer of Beaver County, Pennsylvania 1805–11; U.S. Representative from Pennsylvania 1817–21; Pennsylvania State Representative 1830–31. Grandfather of Michael D. Harter.
  - Michael D. Harter (1846–1896), U.S. Representative from Ohio 1891–95. Grandson of Robert Moore.

== Hartigans ==
- Matthew D. Hartigan (1888–1961), Associate Justice of the Municipal Court of Chicago 1924–52; Justice of the Superior Court of Cook County 1952–61. Democratic candidate for Cook County State's Attorney in 1932. Brother of David Hartigan.
- David Hartigan (1906–1959), City Treasurer of Chicago 1954–55; Chicago City Alderman from the 49th ward 1955–59
  - Neil Hartigan (1938–), Lieutenant Governor of Illinois 1973–77; Attorney General of Illinois 1983–91; Judge of the Illinois First District Appellate Court 2002–04; Judge of the Illinois Court of Claims 2013–19. Son of David Hartigan.
    - Laura Hartigan, Finance Director of the Democratic National Committee 1993–95; National Finance Director of Bill Clinton's 1996 presidential campaign. Daughter of Neil Hartigan.

== Hartkes ==
- Vance Hartke (1919–2003), Mayor of Evansville, Indiana 1956–58; U.S. Senator from Indiana 1959–77, candidate for Democratic nomination for President of the United States 1972. Father of Anita Hartke.
  - Anita Hartke, candidate for U.S. Representative from Virginia 2008. Daughter of Vance Hartke.

== Harveys ==
- Jonathan Harvey (1780–1859), New Hampshire State Representative 1811–16 1831–34 1838–40, New Hampshire State Senator 1816–23, New Hampshire Executive Councilman 1823–25, U.S. Representative from New Hampshire 1825–31. Brother of Matthew Harvey.
- Matthew Harvey (1781–1866), U.S. Representative from New Hampshire 1821–25, New Hampshire State Senator 1825–27, New Hampshire Executive Councilman 1828–29, Governor of New Hampshire 1830–31, Judge of the U.S. District Court of New Hampshire 1831–66. Brother of Jonathan Harvey.

== Hasbroucks ==
- Abraham J. Hasbrouck (1773–1845), New York Assemblyman 1811, U.S. Representative from New York 1813–15, New York State Senator 1822. Cousin of Abraham Bruyn Hasbrouck.
- Abraham Bruyn Hasbrouck (1791–1879), U.S. Representative from New York 1825–27. Cousin of Abraham J. Hasbrouck.

== Haskells and Readys ==
- Charles Ready (1802–1878), member of the Tennessee Legislature, U.S. Representative from Tennessee 1853–59. Uncle of William T. Haskell.
  - William T. Haskell (1818–1859), Tennessee State Representative 1840, U.S. Representative from Tennessee 1847–49. Nephew of Charles Ready.

== Mollestons and Haslets ==
- Henry Molleston (1762–1819), delegate to the Delaware Constitutional Convention 1792, Delaware State Representative 1800–08 1814–15, Treasurer of Delaware 1808–13, Delaware State Senator 1815–19, elected Governor of Delaware in 1819 but died before taking office. Uncle of Joseph Haslet and William G. Molleston.
  - Joseph Haslet (1769–1823), candidate for Governor of Delaware 1804 1807, Governor of Delaware 1811–14 1823. Nephew of Henry Molleston.
  - William G. Molleston, Delaware State Representative. Nephew of Henry Molleston.

== Hassaureks and Markbreits ==
- Frederick Hassaurek (1832–1885), delegate to the Republican National Convention 1860 and 1868, U.S. Minister to Ecuador 1861–66. Brother of Leopold Markbreit.
- Leopold Markbreit (1842–1909), U.S. Minister to Bolivia 1869–73, Mayor of Cincinnati, Ohio 1908–09. Brother of Frederick Hassaurek.

== Hastingses ==
- Seth Hastings (1762–1831), Treasurer of Mendon, Massachusetts 1794–95; U.S. Representative from Massachusetts 1801–07; Massachusetts State Senator 1810 1814; Chief Justice of the Court of Sessions of Worcester County, Massachusetts 1819–28. Father of William Soden Hastings.
  - William Soden Hastings (1798–1842), Massachusetts State Representative 1828, Massachusetts State Senator 1829–33, U.S. Representative from Massachusetts 1837–42. Son of Seth Hastings.

== Hatcher Family ==
- Richard G. Hatcher (1933 – 2019), Mayor of Gary, Indiana 1968-1988
  - Ragen Hatcher (1978), Indiana State Representative 2019-Present

== Hattons and Whitings ==
- Justin R. Whiting (1847–1903), Mayor of St. Clair, Michigan 1879; Michigan State Senator 1882; U.S. Representative from Michigan 1887–95; candidate for Governor of Michigan 1898; candidate for U.S. Representative from Michigan 1900; Chairman of the Michigan Democratic Committee. Father-in-law of William Hatton.
  - William Hatton (1864–1944), Chairman of the Ottawa County, Michigan Republican Party 1920–38; delegate to the Republican National Convention 1928 1932. Son-in-law of Justin R. Whiting.

== Haweses ==
- Aylett Hawes (1768–1833), Virginia House Delegate 1802–06, U.S. Representative from Virginia 1811–17. Uncle of Richard Hawes, Albert Gallatin Hawes, and Aylett Hawes Buckner.
  - Richard Hawes (1797–1877), Kentucky State Representative 1828–29 1834, candidate for U.S. Senate from Kentucky 1834, U.S. Representative from Kentucky 1837–41, Confederate Governor of Kentucky 1862–65, Judge of Bourbon County, Kentucky 1866–77. Nephew of Aylett Hawes.
  - Albert Gallatin Hawes (1804–1849), U.S. Representative from Kentucky 1831–37. Nephew of Aylett Hawes.
  - Aylett Hawes Buckner (1816–1894), Clerk of Pike County, Kentucky Court; Surveyor of Public Works of Missouri 1854–55; Judge in Kentucky; Missouri Democratic Committeeman 1868; delegate to the Democratic National Convention 1872; U.S. Representative from Missouri 1873–85. Nephew of Aylett Hawes.
    - Harry B. Hawes (1869–1947), Missouri State Representative 1916, U.S. Representative from Missouri 1921–26, U.S. Senator from Missouri 1926–33. Grandnephew of Albert Gallatin Hawes.

== Hawkins ==
- Philemon Hawkins II (1717–1801), delegate to the North Carolina Provincial Congress in Halifax in 1776, North Carolina General Assembly between 1779 and 1787; 1782–1783, elected to Council of State in the General Assembly; Lieutenant Colonel in the Bute and Warren County regiments during the American Revolution
  - Benjamin Hawkins (1754–1816), North Carolina State Representative 1778–79 1784, delegate to the Continental Congress from North Carolina 1781–83 1787, U.S. Senator from North Carolina 1789–95. Uncle of Micajah Thomas Hawkins.
  - Philemon Hawkins III, North Carolina Assemblyman. son of Philemon Hawkins II, brother of Benjamin Hawkins.
    - William Hawkins (1777–1819), Governor of North Carolina 1811–14. Son of Philemon Hawkins III.
    - Micajah Thomas Hawkins (1790–1858), member of the North Carolina House of Commons 1819–20, North Carolina State Senator 1823–27 1846, U.S. Representative from North Carolina 1831–41, member of the North Carolina Council of State 1854–55. Nephew of Benjamin Hawkins.

NOTE: Micajah Thomas Hawkins was also nephew of U.S. Speaker of the House of Representatives Nathaniel Macon.

== Hawkins of Tennessee ==
- John Neely Johnson (1825–1872), Attorney of Sacramento, California 1850–52; California Assemblyman; Governor of California 1856–58; delegate to the Nevada Constitutional Convention 1863; President of the Nevada Constitutional Convention 1864; Justice of the Nevada Supreme Court 1867–71. First cousin once removed of Alvin Hawkins, Ashton Hawkins, and Albert Hawkins.
  - Alvin Hawkins (1821–1905), Justice of the Tennessee Supreme Court 1865–68, Governor of Tennessee 1881–83. First cousin once removed of John Neely Johnson.
  - Ashton Hawkins (1824–1888), Clerk of the Tennessee Circuit Court. First cousin once removed of John Neely Johnson.
  - Albert Hawkins (1841–1908), Judge in Tennessee, Tennessee State Senator. First cousin once removed of John Neely Johnson.

== Hays ==
- William H. Hays Sr. (1879–1954), Chairman of the Republican National Committee 1918–21, Postmaster General of the United States 1921–22. Father of William H. Hays Jr..
  - William H. Hays Jr., Mayor of Crawfordsville, Indiana. Son of William H. Hays Sr..

== Hayes ==
- James A. Hayes (born 1946), U.S. Representative from Louisiana 1987–97, candidate for Republican nomination for U.S. Senate from Louisiana 1996. Brother of Fredric Hayes.
- Fredric Hayes, candidate for U.S. Representative from Louisiana 1992. Brother of James A. Hayes.

== Hayes of Ohio ==
- Rutherford B. Hayes (1822–1893), U.S. Representative from Ohio 1865–67, Governor of Ohio 1868–72 1876–77, President of the United States 1877–81. Father of Webb Hayes.
  - Webb Hayes (1856–1934), member of the Ohio Legislature. Son of Rutherford B. Hayes.

== Haynes ==
- Arthur Peronneau Hayne (1789–1867), South Carolina State Representative, U.S. Senator from South Carolina 1858. Brother of Robert Young Hayne.
- Robert Young Hayne (1791–1839), South Carolina State Representative 1814–18, Attorney General of South Carolina 1818–22, U.S. Attorney of South Carolina 1820, U.S. Senator from South Carolina 1823–32, Governor of South Carolina 1832–34, Mayor of Charleston, South Carolina 1835–37. Brother of Arthur Peronneau Hayne.

NOTE: Robert Young Hayne was also son-in-law of U.S. Senator Charles Pinckney.

== Hayneses of Louisiana ==
- O. H. Haynes Sr. (1888–1969), sheriff of Webster Parish, Louisiana, from 1933 to 1952, father of O. H. Haynes Jr., and Cleone Hodges
  - O. H. Haynes Jr. (1920–1996), sheriff of Webster Parish, Louisiana from 1964 to 1980, son of O. H. Haynes Sr., brother of Cleone Hodges
  - Cleone Haynes Hodges (1909–2012), professor at Appalachian State University, secretary of the Watauga Parks and Recreation Commission, and a member of the town beautification committee in her adopted city of Boone, North Carolina, daughter of O. H. Haynes Sr., and sister of O. H. Haynes Jr.

== Hazeltons ==
- Clark B. Cochrane (1815–1867), New York Assemblyman 1844 1866, U.S. Representative from New York 1857–61. Uncle of Gerry Whiting Hazelton and George Cochrane Hazelton.
  - Gerry Whiting Hazelton (1829–1920), Wisconsin State Senator 1860, delegate to the Republican National Convention 1860, District Attorney of Columbia County, Wisconsin 1864–66; Collector of Internal Revenue for Wisconsin 1866; U.S. Representative from Wisconsin 1871–75; U.S. Attorney for Wisconsin; Special Master in Chancery for Wisconsin; U.S. Court Commissioner; Milwaukee County, Wisconsin Court Commissioner. Nephew of Clark B. Cochrane.
  - George Cochrane Hazelton (1832–1922), Wisconsin State Senator 1869–71, U.S. Representative from Wisconsin 1877–83. Nephew of Clark B. Cochrane.

== Hazzards ==
- David Hazzard (1781–1864), Governor of Delaware 1830–33. Father of John Alexander Hazzard.
  - John Alexander Hazzard, Delaware State Senator 1855–58. Son of David Hazzard.

NOTE: David Hazzard was also brother-in-law of Delaware Governor John Collins.

== Heards and Hawes ==
See Heard-Hawes Family

== Hearsts ==
- George Hearst (1820–1891), U.S. Senator from California, 1886–91.
  - William Randolph Hearst (1863–1951), newspaper baron; U.S. Representative from New York, 1903–07; candidate for Democratic nomination for president, 1904.

== Heebes ==
- Frederick Jacob Reagan Heebe (1922–2014), New Orleans lawyer and Judge for the United States District Court for the Eastern District of Louisiana, first appointed in 1966 by U.S. President Lyndon B. Johnson, retired 1996; former Jefferson Parish judge and council member, father of developer Frederick Riley Heebe (born 1952), father-in-law of Jennifer Sneed Heebe
  - Jennifer Sneed Heebe (born 1966), member of the Louisiana House of Representatives for Jefferson Parish, 1999–2004; member of the Jefferson Parish Council, 2004–08, wife of developer Frederick Riley Heebe and daughter-in-law of Judge Frederick Jacob Reagan Heebe

== Heflins ==
- Robert Stell Heflin (1815–1901), Georgia State Senator 1840–41, Alabama State Representative 1849 1860, Alabama State Senator 1860, Randolph County, Alabama Probate Court Judge 1865–66; U.S. Representative from Alabama 1869–71. Uncle of James Thomas Heflin.
  - James Thomas Heflin (1869–1951), U.S. Representative from Alabama 1904–20, U.S. Senator from Alabama 1920–31. Nephew of Robert Stell Heflin.
    - Howell Heflin (1921–2005), Chief Justice of the Alabama Supreme Court 1971–77, U.S. Senator from Alabama 1979–97. Nephew of James Thomas Heflin.

== Heilmans and LaFollettes ==
- William Heilman (1824–1890), Evansville, Indiana Councilman 1852–65; Indiana State Representative 1870–76; delegate to the Republican National Convention 1876; Indiana State Senator 1876–79; U.S. Representative from Indiana 1879–83. Great-grandfather of Charles M. LaFollette.
  - Charles M. LaFollette (1898–1974), Indiana State Representative 1927–29, U.S. Representative from Indiana 1943–47, candidate for the Republican nomination for U.S. Senate from Indiana 1946. Great-grandson of William Heilman.

== Heitkamps ==
- Heidi Heitkamp (born 1955), United States Senator from North Dakota; former Attorney General and Tax Commissioner of North Dakota
- Jason Heitkamp (fl. 2020s), former North Dakota State Senator; cousin of Heidi and Joel
- Joel Heitkamp (born 1961), former North Dakota State Senator; brother of Heidi

== Heitmeiers ==
- Francis C. Heitmeier (born 1950), Democratic member of both the Louisiana House of Representatives 1984–92 and the Louisiana State Senate 1992–2008 from New Orleans, brother of David Heitmeier
- David Heitmeier (born 1961), Democratic member of the Louisiana Senate since 2008; optometrist in New Orleans, brother of Francis C. Heitmeier

== Hemphills ==
- John Hemphill (1803–1862), Judge in Texas 1840–42, delegate to the Texas Constitutional Convention 1845, Chief Justice of the Texas Supreme Court 1846–58, U.S. Senator from Texas 1859–61, Confederate States Provisional Representative from Texas 1861–62. Uncle of John J. Hemphill.
  - John J. Hemphill (1849–1912), South Carolina State Representative 1876, U.S. Representative from South Carolina 1883–93. Nephew of John Hemphill.
  - William H. Brawley (1841–1916), South Carolina State Representative 1882–90, U.S. Representative from South Carolina 1891–94, Judge of U.S. District Court of South Carolina 1894–1911. Cousin of John J. Hemphill.
    - Robert Witherspoon Hemphill (1915–1983), South Carolina State Representative 1947–48, U.S. Representative from South Carolina 1957–64, Judge of U.S. District Court in South Carolina 1964. Grandnephew of John J. Hemphill and William H. Brawley.

NOTE: Robert Witherspoon Hemphill was also great-great-grandson of U.S. Representative Robert Witherspoon.

== Hendersons ==
- John Williams (1731–1799), member of the North Carolina House of Commons 1777–78, Delegate to the Continental Congress from North Carolina 1778–79, North Carolina Superior Court Judge. First cousin of Richard Henderson and Thomas Henderson.
- Richard Henderson (1734–1785), North Carolina Superior Court Judge, North Carolina Assemblyman. First cousin of John Williams.
- Thomas Henderson (1752–1815), North Carolina Colony Congressman 1775. First cousin of John Williams.
- John Williams (1740–1804), North Carolina Colony Congressman 1775. First cousin of John Williams, Richard Henderson, and Thomas Henderson.
- Nathaniel Williams Jr. (1742–1805), North Carolina Colony Congressman 1775. First cousin of John Williams, Richard Henderson, and Thomas Henderson.
- Robert Williams (1744–1790), Adjutant General of North Carolina. First cousin of John Williams, Richard Henderson and, Thomas Henderson.
- Joseph Williams (1748–1827), North Carolina Colony Congressman 1775. First cousin of John Williams, Richard Henderson, and Thomas Henderson.
  - Archibald Henderson (1768–1822), Clerk of Salisbury, North Carolina 1795–98; U.S. Representative from North Carolina 1799–1803; member of the North Carolina House of Commons 1807–09 1814 1819–20. Son of Richard Henderson.
  - Leonard Henderson (1772–1833), North Carolina Assemblyman, Justice of the North Carolina Supreme Court, Chief Justice of the North Carolina Supreme Court 1829–33. Son of Richard Henderson.
  - Robert Burton (1747–1825), Delegate to the Continental Congress from North Carolina 1787. Son-in-law of John William.
  - Matthew Clay (1754–1815), Virginia House Delegate 1790–94, U.S. Representative from Virginia 1797–1813 1815. Second cousin by marriage of Archibald Henderson.
    - Christopher Harris Williams (1798–1857), U.S. Representative from Tennessee 1837–43 1849–53. Grandson of John Williams.
    - Hutchins Gordon Burton (1782–1836), member of the North Carolina House of Commons 1809 1817, Attorney General of North Carolina 1810–16, U.S. Representative from North Carolina 1819–24, Governor of North Carolina 1824–27. Nephew of Robert Burton.
    - Matthew Clay (1795–1827), Alabama State Representative 1825–27. Son of Matthew Clay.
      - John Sharp Williams (1854–1932), U.S. Representative from Mississippi 1893–1909, U.S. Senator from Mississippi 1911–23, delegate to the Democratic National Convention 1920. Grandson of Christopher Harris Williams.
      - Sydenham B. Alexander (1840–1921), North Carolina State Senator 1879 1883–87 1901, U.S. Representative from North Carolina 1891–95. Cousin of John Sharp Williams.
      - Adlai E. Stevenson I (1835–1914), U.S. Representative from Illinois 1875–77 1879–81, delegate to the Democratic National Convention 1892, Vice President of the United States 1893–97, candidate for Vice President of the United States 1900, candidate for Governor of Illinois 1908. Cousin of Sydenham B. Alexander.
        - John Sharp Williams Jr., delegate to the Democratic National Convention 1936 1940 1944 1948. Son of John Sharp Williams.
        - Lewis Stevenson (1868–1929), Illinois Secretary of State 1914–17, delegate to the Democratic National Convention 1928. Son of Adlai E. Stevenson.
        - Julia McGehee Alexander, North Carolina State Representative. Daughter of Sydenham B. Alexander.
          - Adlai Stevenson II (1900–1965), delegate to the Democratic National Convention 1948 1952 1956 1960, Governor of Illinois 1949–53, candidate for President of the United States 1952 1956, U.S. Ambassador to the United Nations 1961–65. Son of Lewis Stevenson.
            - Adlai Stevenson III (born 1930), Illinois State Representative 1965–67, Treasurer of Illinois 1967–70, U.S. Senator from Illinois 1970–81, delegate to the Democratic National Convention 1972, candidate for Governor of Illinois 1982 1986. Son of Adlai Stevenson.

NOTE: Matthew Clay was also brother of Kentucky State Senator Green Clay, second cousin of U.S. Representatives Robert Williams and Marmaduke Williams, first cousin by marriage of U.S. Senator John Williams and U.S. Representative Lewis Williams, first cousin once removed of Speaker of the U.S. House of Representatives Henry Clay and Kentucky Auditor of Public Accounts Porter Clay, second cousin once removed of U.S. Senator Clement Comer Clay, first cousin twice removed of U.S. Minister Thomas H. Clay and U.S. Representative James Brown Clay, uncle of U.S. Representative Brutus J. Clay and Kentucky State Representative Cassius Marcellus Clay, second cousin twice removed of U.S. Senator Clement Claiborne Clay Jr., granduncle of U.S. Senator Thomas Clay McCreery and U.S. Minister Brutus J. Clay. Adlai E. Stevenson I was also cousin of U.S. Minister James S. Ewing.

== Hendrickses ==
- Thomas Hendricks Sr. (1773–1835), Indiana State Representative 1823–25 1827–31, Indiana State Senator 1831–34. Brother of William Hendricks and John Hendricks.
- William Hendricks (1782–1850), Governor of Indiana 1822–25, U.S. Senator from Indiana 1825–37. Brother of Thomas Hendricks Sr. and John Hendricks.
- John Hendricks (1791–1866), Indiana State Representative 1841–42, candidate for Indiana State Senate 1845. Brother of Thomas Hendricks Sr. and William Hendricks.
  - Abram Hendricks (1805–1878), Sheriff of Decatur County, Indiana 1829 1841–45; Indiana State Representative 1838–39; Treasurer of Decatur County, Indiana 1847–55; Indiana Republican Executive Committeeman 1860. Son of Thomas Hendricks Sr.
  - William Hendricks Jr. (1809–1850), Indiana State Representative 1846–47, Indiana State Senator 1848–50. Son of William Hendricks.
  - Thomas A. Hendricks (1819–1885), Indiana State Representative 1848–1951, delegate to the Indiana Constitutional Convention 1850 1851, U.S. Representative from Indiana 1851–55, Commissioner of the United States General Land Office 1855–59, candidate for Governor of Indiana 1860 1868, U.S. Senator from Indiana 1863–69, candidate for the Democratic nomination for President of the United States 1868 1876 1884, Governor of Indiana 1873–77, candidate for Vice President of the United States 1876, Vice President of the United States 1885. Son of John Hendricks.
  - Abram W. Hendricks (1822–1887), Indiana State Representative 1853, candidate for Justice of the Indiana Supreme Court 1858. Nephew of Thomas Hendricks Sr., William Hendricks, and John Hendricks.
  - William C. Hendricks (1825–1892), California Secretary of State 1887–91. First cousin of Thomas A. Hendricks.
    - Scott Hendricks (1878–1960), candidate for Republican nomination for U.S. Representative from California 1932. Son of William C. Hendricks.

== Henleys ==
- Thomas J. Henley (1810–1865), Indiana State Representative 1832–42, U.S. Representative from Indiana 1843–49, California State Representative 1851–53, Postmaster of San Francisco 1860–64. Father of Barclay Henley.
  - Barclay Henley (1843–1914), California Assemblyman 1869–70, District Attorney of Sonoma County, California 1875–76; U.S. Representative from California 1883–87. Son of Thomas J. Henley.

== Henleys of Arkansas ==
- Mary Elizabeth Smith Massey (1900–1971) among the first women lawyers in Arkansas. In 1934, she was elected on the Republican ticket to the first of three terms as county/circuit clerk in Searcy County, Arkansas. As an appointed city attorney in 1935, she developed the blueprint for the water city system in Marshall, Arkansas, and campaigned for a bond issue to finance the project. Aunt by marriage of Jesse and Ben Henley. Aunt by marriage of Jesse and Ben Henley.
  - Ben C. Henley (1907–1987) was the state chairman of the Arkansas Republican Party from 1955 to 1962. In 1956, he was his party's unsuccessful nominee against the Democratic U.S. Senator J. William Fulbright. Brother of Jesse Henley and nephew by marriage of Mary Massey.
  - Jesse Smith Henley (1917–1997) was a judge of the United States District Court for the combined Eastern and Western districts in Arkansas and the Court of Appeals for the Eighth Circuit. The federal building in Harriso, Arkansas, is named in his honor. Brother of Ben C. Henley and nephew by marriage of Mary Massey.

== Henrys ==
- Patrick Henry (1843–1930), Mississippi State Representative 1878–90, delegate to the Mississippi Constitutional Convention 1890, U.S. Representative from Mississippi 1897–1901, Mississippi State Senator 1904–08, Mayor of Brandon, Mississippi 1916–30. Uncle of Patrick Henry.
  - Patrick Henry (1861–1933), Attorney of Vicksburg, Mississippi 1884–88; Mississippi State Senator 1888–90; District Attorney in Mississippi 1890–1900; delegate to the Democratic National Convention 1896; Judge in Mississippi 1900–01; U.S. Representative from Mississippi 1901–03. Nephew of Patrick Henry.

== Henrys of Texas and Virginia ==
- Patrick Henry (1736–1799), Delegate to the Continental Congress from Virginia 1774, Governor of Virginia 1776, Virginia State Senator 1799. Great-great-great-grandfather of Robert L. Henry.
  - Robert L. Henry (1864–1931), Mayor of Texarkana, Texas 1890; U.S. Representative from Texas 1897–1917. Great-great-great-grandson of Patrick Henry.

NOTE: Patrick Henry was also cousin of U.S. Representative Isaac Coles, uncle by marriage of U.S. Representative Francis Preston, grandfather of U.S. Senator William Henry Roane, and granduncle of U.S. Senator William Campbell Preston.

== Henrys of Washington ==
- Al B. Henry (1911–1989), Washington State Representative and State Senator.
  - Mildred Henry (1904–1988), Washington State Representative. Wife of Al Henry.

== Henrys and Lloyds ==
- John Henry (1750–1798), Maryland House Delegate 1777–80, Delegate to the Continental Congress from Maryland 1778–80 1785–86, Maryland State Senator 1780–90, U.S. Senator from Maryland 1789–97, Governor of Maryland 1797–98. Great-grandfather of Henry Lloyd.
  - Henry Lloyd (1852–1920), Maryland State Senator 1882–84, Governor of Maryland 1885–88, Maryland Circuit Court Judge 1892–1908. Great-grandson of John Henry.

NOTE: Henry Lloyd was also grandson of U.S. Senator Edward Lloyd, great-grandson of Continental Congressional Delegate Edward Lloyd, and great-great-grandson of Maryland Colony Governor Edward Lloyd.

== Hepburns, Chittendens, Galushas, and Lyons ==
- Thomas Chittenden (1730–1797), Governor of Vermont 1778–89 1790–97. Father of Martin Chittenden.
  - Martin Chittenden (1763–1840), member of the Vermont Legislature, Vermont State Court Judge, U.S. Representative from Vermont 1803–13, Governor of Vermont 1813–15. Son of Thomas Chittenden.
  - Matthew Lyon (1749–1822), Vermont State Representative 1779–83, candidate for U.S. Representative from Vermont 1790 1792 1794, U.S. Representative from Vermont 1797–1801, Kentucky State Representative 1802, U.S. Representative from Kentucky 1803–11, candidate for U.S. Congressional Delegate from Arkansas Territory 1822. Son-in-law of Thomas Chittenden.
  - Jonas Galusha (1753–1834), Governor of Vermont 1809–13 1815–20. Son-in-law of Thomas Chittenden.
    - Chittenden Lyon (1787–1842), Kentucky State Representative 1822–24, Kentucky State Senator 1827–35, U.S. Representative from Kentucky 1827–35. Son of Matthew Lyon.
      - William Peters Hepburn (1833–1916), Prosecuting Attorney of Marshall County, Iowa; District Attorney in Iowa 1856–61; U.S. Representative from Iowa 1881–87 1893–1909. Great-grandson of Matthew Lyon.

== Herberts ==
- Thomas J. Herbert (1894–1974), Attorney General of Ohio 1939–45, Governor of Ohio 1947–49, delegate to the Republican National Convention 1948, Justice of the Ohio Supreme Court 1957–62. Father of John D. Herbert.
  - John D. Herbert (1930–2017), Treasurer of Ohio 1963–71. Son of Thomas J. Herbert.

== Hernandezes ==
- Daniel Hernández Jr. (1990-), former Arizona State Representative (2017-2023)
- Alma Hernandez (1993-), Arizona State Representative (2019-)
- Consuelo Hernandez, Arizona State Representative (2023-)

== Herricks ==
- Ebenezer Herrick (1785–1839), Massachusetts State Representative 1819, U.S. Representative from Maine 1821–27, Maine State Senator 1828–29. Father of Anson Herrick.
  - Anson Herrick (1812–1868), New York City Alderman 1854–56, U.S. Representative from New York 1863–65. Son of Ebenezer Herrick.

== Herseths ==
- Ralph Herseth, Governor of South Dakota
- Lorna Herseth, wife of Ralph, South Dakota Secretary of State
  - Lars Herseth, son of Ralph and Lorna, South Dakota state legislator and unsuccessful candidate for Governor
    - Stephanie Herseth Sandlin, daughter of Lars, member of the U.S. House of Representatives from South Dakota
    - Max Sandlin, husband of Stephanie, member of the U.S. House of Representatives from Texas

== Hertels ==
- Curtis Hertel (1953–2016), Michigan House of Representatives (1981–98), Speaker of the Michigan House of Representatives (1997–98). Brother of John C. Hertel and Dennis M. Hertel.
  - Curtis Hertel Jr. (born 1978) Ingham County Commission (2001–08), Ingham County Register of Deeds (2008–2014); Michigan Senate (2015–22); Chairman of the Michigan Democratic Party (2025–present). Son of Curtis Hertel Sr.
- Dennis Hertel (born 1948), Michigan House of Representatives (1975–80), U.S. Representative from Michigan (1981–93). Brother of John C. Hertel and Curtis Hertel.
- John C. Hertel (born 1946), Michigan Senate (1974–82), Wayne County Commission (1983–86), Macomb County Commission (1989–2002). Brother of Dennis Hertel and Curtis Hertel.
  - John J. Hertel (born 1978), 2002 candidate for the Michigan House of Representatives. Son of John C. Hertel.
  - Kevin Hertel (born 1985), Michigan House of Representatives (2017–23); Michigan Senate (2023–present)

== Herters ==
- Christian Herter (1895–1966), Massachusetts State Representative 1931–43, delegate to the Republican National Convention 1932 1940 1949 1952 1956, U.S. Representative from Massachusetts 1943–53, Governor of Massachusetts 1953–57 U.S. Secretary of State 1959–61. Father of Christian A. Herter Jr.
  - Christian A. Herter Jr. (1919–2007), Massachusetts State Representative 1951–53, delegate to the Republican National Convention 1956 1960, Massachusetts Executive Councilman 1956, candidate for Attorney General of Massachusetts 1958. Son of Christian Herter.

== Hevesis ==
- Alan Hevesi (born 1940), member of the New York State Assembly (1971–1993), Comptroller of New York City (1994–2001), New York State Comptroller (2003–2006). Father of Andrew and Daniel Hevesi.
  - Daniel Hevesi (born 1970), New York State Senator (1998–2002). Son of Alan Hevesi, brother of Andrew Hevesi
  - Andrew Hevesi (born 1973), member of the New York State Assembly (since 2005). Son of Alan Hevesi, brother of Daniel Hevesi

== Hewes ==
- Joseph Hewes (1730–1779), member of the North Carolina Colony Legislature 1766–75, Delegate to the Continental Congress from North Carolina 1774–77 1779, member of the North Carolina Legislature 1778–79. Relative of Thomas Hewes.
- Thomas Hewes, delegate to the Democratic National Convention 1916 1936 1940, Treasurer of Connecticut 1937. Relative of Joseph Hewes.

== Heywards and Bradfords ==
- Thomas Heyward Jr. (1746–1809), signer of the United States Declaration of Independence and of the Articles of Confederation from South Carolina.
  - Edward Green Bradford (1819–1884), Delaware State Representative 1849–50, Judge of the United States District Court for the District of Delaware 1871–84. Grandson-in-law of Thomas Heyward Jr.
    - Edward Green Bradford II (1848–1928), Delaware State Representative 1880–81, Judge of the United States District Court for the District of Delaware 1897–1918. Son of Edward Green Bradford.

== Hibbards ==
- Harry Hibbard (1816–1872), New Hampshire State Representative 1843–45, New Hampshire State Senator 1845 1847–48, delegate to the Democratic National Convention 1848 1856, U.S. Representative from New Hampshire 1849–55. Cousin of Ellery Albee Hibbard.
- Ellery Albee Hibbard (1826–1903), New Hampshire State Representative 1865–66, U.S. Representative from New Hampshire 1871–73, Justice of the New Hampshire Supreme Court 1873–74. Cousin of Harry Hibbard.

== Hickenloopers ==
- Andrew Hickenlooper (1837–1904), Lieutenant Governor of Ohio 1880–1882. Father of Smith Hickenlooper, great-grandfather of John Hickenlooper.
  - Smith Hickenlooper (1880–1933), Judge of the United States District Court for the Southern District of Ohio 1923–29, Judge of the United States Court of Appeals for the Sixth Circuit 1928–33. Grandfather of John Hickenlooper.
  - Bourke B. Hickenlooper (1896–1971), Lieutenant Governor of Iowa 1939–43, Governor of Iowa 1943–45, U.S. Senator from Iowa 1945–69. Cousin of John Hickenlooper.
    - John Hickenlooper (born 1952), Mayor of Denver, Colorado 2003–2011, Governor of Colorado 2011–2019.Senator from Colorado 2021- Grandson of Smith Hickenlooper, great-grandson of Andrew Hickenlooper.

== Hiesters ==
- John Hiester (brother of Daniel): American Revolutionary War colonel; Pennsylvania militia general; Congressman 1807–09
  - Daniel Hiester the Younger (son of John): Pennsylvania Congressman 1809–11
- Daniel Hiester (brother of John): General in Pennsylvania militia; member of Pennsylvanian Supreme Executive Council; Congressman 1788–96 1800–04
- Gabriel Hiester (cousin of Daniel and John): Colonel in Continental Army; state senator 1795–96 1805–12
- Joseph Hiester (cousin of John and Daniel): Revolutionary War officer; congressman 1803–17; Governor of Pennsylvania 1820–23
  - William Hiester (1790–1853), U.S. Representative from Pennsylvania 1831–37, member of the Pennsylvania Legislature. Nephew of John Hiester and Daniel Hiester.
  - Henry Augustus Philip Muhlenberg (1782–1844), U.S. Representative from Pennsylvania 1829–38, candidate for Governor of Pennsylvania 1835, U.S. Minister to Austria 1838–40. Son-in-law of Joseph Hiester.
    - Isaac Ellmaker Hiester (1824–1871), U.S. Representative from Pennsylvania 1853–55. Son of William Hiester.
    - Hiester Clymer (1827–1884), delegate to the Democratic National Convention 1860 1876, member of the Pennsylvania Legislature, candidate for Governor of Pennsylvania 1866, U.S. Representative from Pennsylvania 1873–81. Nephew of William Hiester.
    - Henry Augustus Muhlenberg (1823–1854), member of the Pennsylvania Legislature, U.S. Representative from Pennsylvania 1853–54. Son of Henry Augustus Philip Muhlenberg.

NOTE: Henry Augustus Philip Muhlenberg was also nephew of U.S. Senator John Peter Gabriel Muhlenberg and Speaker of the U.S. House of Representatives Frederick Augustus Conrad Muhlenberg.

== Hills ==
- Hugh Lawson White Hill (1810–1892), Tennessee State Representative 1837–39 1841, U.S. Representative from Tennessee 1845–47, delegate to the Tennessee Constitutional Convention 1870. Cousin of Benjamin Harvey Hill.
- Benjamin Harvey Hill (1823–1882), Georgia State Representative 1851, Georgia State Senator 1859–60, Confederate States Representative from Georgia 1861, Confederate States Senator from Georgia 1861–65, U.S. Representative from Georgia 1875–77, U.S. Senator from Georgia 1877–82. Cousin of Hugh Lawson White Hill.

== Hills of Louisiana ==
- Herman Ray Hill (born 1937), former member of the Louisiana House of Representatives for Allen, Beauregard, and Calcasieu parishes from 1992 to 2008, when he was term-limited. Husband of Dorothy Sue Hill
- Dorothy Sue Hill (born 1939), succeeded her husband, Herman Ray Hill, as state representative for Allen, Beauregard, and Calcasieu parishes in southwestern Louisiana in 2008

== Hill and Hubbard of Alabama ==
- Lister Hill, U.S. senator from Alabama 1938–69; member of the U.S. House of Representatives from Alabama 1923–38, great-grandfather of Joe Hubbard
  - Joseph Lister Hill Hubbard, member of the Alabama House of Representatives 2011–15; great-grandson of Lister Hill

== Hills and Nicholses ==
- Isaac Hill (1789–1851), New Hampshire State Senator 1820–23 1827–28, New Hampshire State Representative 1826, U.S. Senator from New Hampshire 1831–36, Governor of New Hampshire 1836–39. Uncle by marriage of Henry F. C. Nichols.
  - Henry F. C. Nichols, member President of the Village Board of New Lisbon, Wisconsin; member and Chairman of the County Board of Supervisors of Juneau County, Wisconsin; Wisconsin State Assemblyman. Nephew by marriage of Isaac Hill.

== Hillhouses ==
- William Hillhouse (1728–1816), Connecticut Colony Representative 1756–60 1763–76, Connecticut State Representative 1776–85, Delegate to the Continental Congress from Connecticut 1783–86, Judge of the Connecticut Court of Common Pleas 1784–1806, Connecticut State Senator 1785–1808, New London, Connecticut Probate Court Judge 1786–1807. Father of James Hillhouse.
  - James Hillhouse (1754–1832), Connecticut State Representative 1780–85, Delegate to the Continental Congress from Connecticut, Connecticut Councilman 1789–90, U.S. Representative from Connecticut 1791–96, U.S. Senator from Connecticut 1796–1810. Son of William Hillhouse.
    - Thomas Hillhouse (1817–1897), New York State Senator 1860–61, Comptroller of New York 1866–67. Nephew of James Hillhouse.

NOTE: James Hillhouse was also nephew of Connecticut Governor Matthew Griswold.

== Hillyers ==
- Junius Hillyer (1807–1886), Solicitor General in Georgia, Superior Court Judge in Georgia 1841, Circuit Court Judge in Georgia 1841–45, U.S. Representative from Georgia 1851–55, Solicitor of the U.S. Treasury 1857–61. Father of George Hillyer.
  - George Hillyer (1835–1927), Georgia Assemblyman, delegate to the Democratic National Convention 1860, Georgia State Senator 1870–74, Superior Court Judge in Georgia, Mayor of Atlanta, Georgia 1885–87. Son of Junius Hillyer.

== Hindmans and Holts ==
- Major Robert Holt, member of the Virginia House of Burgesses 1655. Ancestor of Thomas C. Hindman.
  - Thomas C. Hindman (1828–1868), Mississippi State Representative 1854–56, U.S. Representative from Arkansas 1859–61. Descendant of Major Robert Holt.

== Hitchingses ==
- Benjamin Hitchings Jr. (1813–1893), member of the Massachusetts House of Representatives (1841). Brother of John B. and Otis M. Hitchings.
- John B. Hitchings (1815–1887), member of the Massachusetts House of Representatives (1853). Brother of Otis M. and Benjamin Hitchings Jr.
  - Charles S. Hitchings (1844–1894), member of the Massachusetts House of Representatives (1886–1887). Son of John B. Hitchings.
- Otis M. Hitchings (1822–1894), member of the Massachusetts House of Representatives (1876). Brother of John B. and Benjamin Hitchings Jr.

Note: John B. Hitchings was also the son-in-law of Charles Sweetser and the brother-in-law of George H. Sweetser.

== Hitchcocks ==
- Phineas Hitchcock (1831–1881), U.S. Marshal in Nebraska Territory 1861–64, U.S. Congressional Delegate from Nebraska Territory 1865–67, Surveyor of Nebraska 1867–69, Surveyor of Iowa 1867–69, U.S. Senator from Nebraska 1871–77. Father of Gilbert Hitchcock.
  - Gilbert Hitchcock (1859–1934), candidate for U.S. Representative from Nebraska 1898, U.S. Representative from Nebraska 1903–05 1907–11, U.S. Senator from Nebraska 1911–23. Son of Phineas Hitchcock.

== Hitchcocks of Alabama ==
- Samuel Hitchcock (1755–1813), Attorney General of Vermont 1790–93, Judge of the United States District Court for the District of Vermont 1793–1801, Judge of the United States Circuit Court for the Second Circuit 1801–02. Father of Henry Hitchcock.
  - Henry Hitchcock (1792–1839), Secretary of the Alabama Territory, Attorney General of Alabama. Father of Ethan A. Hitchcock.
    - Ethan A. Hitchcock (1835–1909), U.S. Minister to Russia 1897–99, U.S. Secretary of the Interior 1899–1907. Son of Henry Hitchcock.

== Hitts ==
- Robert R. Hitt (1834–1906), U.S. Representative from Illinois 1882–1906. Father of R. S. Reynolds Hitt.
  - R.S. Reynolds Hitt (1876–1938), U.S. Minister to Panama 1909–10, U.S. Minister to Guatemala 1910–13. Son of Robert R. Hitt.

== Hoadleys ==
- George Hoadley (1781–1857), Mayor of Cleveland, Ohio 1846–47. Father of George Hoadly.
  - George Hoadly (1826–1902), delegate to the Ohio Constitutional Convention 1873, Governor of Ohio 1884–86. Son of George Hoadley.

== Hobarts and Tuttles ==
- Socrates Tuttle, Mayor of Paterson, New Jersey 1871–72. Father of Garret Hobart.
  - Garret Hobart (1844–1899), New Jersey Assemblyman 1873–74, New Jersey State Senator 1877–82, Republican National Committeeman 1884–96, Vice President of the United States 1897–99. Son-in-law of Socrates Tuttle.

== Hobbys ==
- Edwin Hobby, Texas State Senator 1874–79. Father of William P. Hobby.
  - William P. Hobby (1878–1964), Lieutenant Governor of Texas 1914–17, Governor of Texas 1917–21. Son of Edwin Hobby.
  - Oveta Culp Hobby (1905–1995), U.S. Secretary of Health, Education and Welfare 1953–55. Wife of William P. Hobby.
    - William P. Hobby Jr. (born 1932), Lieutenant Governor of Texas 1973–91. Son of William P. Hobby and Oveta Culp Hobby.
    - Henry E. Catto Jr. (1930–2011), candidate for Texas Legislature 1960, U.S. Ambassador to El Salvador 1971–73, Chief of Protocol of the United States 1974–76, U.S. Ambassador to the United Nations Office at Geneva 1976–77, U.S. Ambassador to the United Kingdom 1989–91. Son-in-law of William P. Hobby and Oveta Culp Hobby.
      - Paul Hobby, candidate for Texas Comptroller 1998. Son of William P. Hobby Jr.

== Hobsons and Morrisons ==
- Richmond Pearson Hobson (1870–1937), U.S. Representative from Alabama 1907–15. Uncle of James H. Morrison.
  - James H. Morrison (1908–2000), U.S. Representative from Louisiana 1943–67. Nephew of Richmond Pearson Hobson.

== Hochs ==
- Edward W. Hoch (1849–1925), Kansas State Representative 1889, Governor of Kansas 1905–09. Father of Homer Hoch.
  - Homer Hoch (1879–1949), U.S. Representative from Kansas 1919–33, Justice of the Kansas Supreme Court 1938–49. Son of Edward W. Hoch.

== Hodges ==
- Luther H. Hodges (1898–1974), Lieutenant Governor of North Carolina 1953–54, Governor of North Carolina 1954–61, U.S. Secretary of Commerce 1961–65. Father of Luther H. Hodges Jr.
  - Luther H. Hodges Jr. (born 1936), candidate for the Democratic nomination for U.S. Senate from North Carolina 1978. Son of Luther H. Hodges.

== Hoffeckers ==
- John H. Hoffecker (1827–1900), delegate to the Republican National Convention 1876 1884, Smyrna, Delaware Councilman 1878–98; candidate for Governor of Delaware 1886 1896; Delaware State Representative 1899–90; U.S. Representative from Delaware 1899–1900. Father of Walter O. Hoffecker.
  - Walter O. Hoffecker (1854–1934), U.S. Representative from Delaware 1900–01, delegate to the Republican National Convention 1908. Son of John H. Hoffecker.

== Hoffmans ==
- Josiah Ogden Hoffman (1766–1837), New York State Assemblyman 1790–95 1796–97, New York Attorney General 1795–1802, Recorder of New York City 1810–11 1813–15.
  - Ogden Hoffman (1794–1856), New York County District Attorney 1829–35, U.S. Representative 1837–41, U.S. Attorney for the Southern District of New York 1841–45, New York Attorney General 1854–55. Son of Josiah Ogden Hoffman.
    - Ogden Hoffman Jr. (1822–1891), Judge of the United States District Court for the Northern District of California 1851–66, Judge of the United States District Court for the Southern District of California 1852–54, Judge of the United States District Court for the District of California 1866–86, Judge of the United States District Court for the Northern District of California 1886–91. Son of Ogden Hoffman.

NOTE: Josiah Ogden Hoffman was also brother-in-law of U.S. Representative Gulian C. Verplanck and New York County District Attorney John Rodman. Ogden Hoffman was also son-in-law of U.S. Senator, Secretary of the Navy, and Governor of New Jersey Samuel L. Southard.

== Hofheinzes ==
- Roy Hofheinz (1912–1982), Texas State Representative 1934–36, Judge of Harris County, Texas 1936–44; Mayor of Houston, Texas 1953–55. Father of Fred Hofheinz.
  - Fred Hofheinz (born 1938), Mayor of Houston, Texas 1974–77; delegate to the Democratic National Convention 1980. Son of Roy Hofheinz.

== Hogans and Sterlings ==
- Lawrence Hogan (1928–2017), U.S. representative from Maryland (1969–1975), Prince George's County Executive (1978–1982)
  - Larry Hogan, (born 1956), Governor of Maryland (2015–2023), son of Lawrence Hogan.
    - Jaymi Sterling, (born 1981), State's Attorney of St. Mary's County, Maryland (2023–present), stepdaughter of Larry Hogan.
  - Patrick N. Hogan (born 1979), Member of Maryland House of Delegates from District 3A 2011–2015. He is the brother of Larry Hogan, and son of Lawrence Hogan.

== Hoges ==
- John Hoge (1760–1824), delegate to the Pennsylvania Constitutional Convention 1790, Pennsylvania State Senator 1790–95, U.S. Representative from Pennsylvania 1804–05. Brother of William Hoge.
- William Hoge (1762–1814), Pennsylvania State Representative 1796–97, U.S. Representative from Pennsylvania 1801–04 1807–09. Brother of John Hoge.

== Hoggs ==
- Charles E. Hogg (1852–1935), Superintendent of Free Schools of Mason County, West Virginia 1875–79; U.S. Representative from West Virginia 1887–89. Father of Robert Lynn Hogg.
  - Robert Lynn Hogg (1893–1973), Prosecuting Attorney of Mason County, West Virginia 1921–24; West Virginia State Senator 1925–29; U.S. Representative from West Virginia 1930–33. Son of Charles E. Hogg.

== Hoggs and Lenoirs ==
- Samuel Hogg (1783–1842), Tennessee State Representative 1813–15, U.S. Representative from Tennessee 1817–19. Father-in-law of Isaac Thomas Lenoir.
- William Ballard Lenoir, Tennessee State Representative, 1815–17
  - Isaac Thomas Lenoir (1807–1875), Tennessee State Representative 1843–45, Tennessee State Senator 1845–47. Son of William Ballard Lenoir. Son-in-law of Samuel Hogg.

NOTE: Isaac Thomas Lenoir was also the grandson of both North Carolina Senate Speaker William Lenoir and North Carolina Attorney General Waightstill Avery.

== Hogins ==
- James Latimer Hogin (1801–1876), Member of the Iowa Senate 1854–58. Father of John Chrisfield Hogin.
  - John Chrisfield Hogin (1823–1886), Member of the Iowa Senate 1864–66. Son of James Latimer Hogin.

== Holcombs ==
- Silas A. Holcomb (1858–1920), Governor of Nebraska 1895–99, Justice of the Nebraska Supreme Court 1900–04, Chief Justice of the Nebraska Supreme Court 1904–06. First cousin of Clarence Holcomb and O.R. Holcomb.
- Clarence Holcomb (1871–1942), delegate to the Democratic National Convention 1932. First cousin of Silas A. Holcomb.
- O.R. Holcomb, candidate for U.S. Representative from Washington 1902, Washington Superior Court Judge 1909–15, Justice of the Washington Supreme Court 1915–19 1921–27 1927–29, Chief Justice of the Washington Supreme Court 1919–21. First cousin of Silas A. Holcomb.

== Hollingsworths and Ways ==
- David Hollingsworth (1844–1929), Mayor of Flushing, Ohio 1867; Prosecuting Attorney of Harrison County, Ohio; Ohio State Senator; Chairman of the Ohio Republican Convention 1882; Attorney General of Ohio 1883–84; U.S. Representative from Ohio 1909–11 1915–19. Third cousin twice removed of Marshall S. Way.
  - Marshall S. Way (1845–1925), member of the West Chester, Pennsylvania House of Burgesses 1895–96. Third cousin twice removed of David A. Hollingsworth.
    - Channing Way (1877–1954), member of the West Chester, Pennsylvania House of Burgesses 1919–21. Son of Marshall S. Way.

== Holloways of Louisiana ==
- Charlie David Holloway (born 1941), member of the Rapides Parish, Louisiana School Board. Brother of Clyde C. Holloway.
- Clyde C. Holloway (1943–2016), candidate for U.S. Representative from Louisiana 1980 1994 2002, U.S. Representative from Louisiana 1987–93, candidate for Republican nomination for Governor of Louisiana 1991, candidate for Republican nomination for U.S. Representative from Louisiana 1996, candidate for Lieutenant Governor of Louisiana 2003, member of the Louisiana Republican Committee. Member of the Louisiana Public Service Commission. Brother of Charlie David Holloway.

== Holloways of Oklahoma ==
- William J. Holloway (1888–1970), Attorney of Choctaw County, Oklahoma 1916–20; Oklahoma State Senator 1920–27; Lieutenant Governor of Oklahoma 1927–29; Governor of Oklahoma 1927–29. Father of William Judson Holloway Jr..
  - William Judson Holloway Jr. (1923–2014), Judge of the U.S. Court of Appeals 1968–92. Son of William J. Holloway.

== Holmans ==
- Jesse Lynch Holman (1784–1842), Judge of the United States District Court for the District of Indiana 1835–42.
  - William S. Holman (1822–1897), U.S. Representative from Indiana 1859–65 1867–77 1881–95 1897. Son of Jesse Lynch Holman.

== Holts ==
- Homer A. Holt (1898–1975), Attorney General of West Virginia 1933–37, Governor of West Virginia 1937–41. Distant cousin of Rush D. Holt Sr.
- Rush D. Holt Sr. (1905–1955), U.S. Senator from West Virginia 1945–51. Distant cousin of Homer A. Holt.
- Helen F. Holt (1913–2015), West Virginia Secretary of State 1957–59. Wife of Rush D. Holt Sr..
  - Rush D. Holt Jr. (born 1948), U.S. Representative from New Jersey 1999–2015. Son of Rush D. Holt Sr. and Helen Holt.
- James Richard Holt Sr. (born 1928) Marion County West Virginia Mayor of Charlotte MI. 1963–67

== Holtons and Kaines ==
- A. Linwood Holton Jr. (1923–2021), Governor of Virginia 1970–74, candidate for Republican nomination for U.S. Senate from Virginia 1978. Father-in-law of Timothy M. Kaine.
  - Timothy M. Kaine (born 1958), Richmond, Virginia Councilman 1994–98; Mayor of Richmond, Virginia 1998–2002; Lieutenant Governor of Virginia 2002–06; Governor of Virginia 2006–2010; Chairman of the Democratic National Committee 2009–2011, running mate with Hillary Clinton in the 2016 Presidential Election. Son-in-law of A. Linwood Holton Jr.
  - Anne Holton (born 1958), Virginia Secretary of Education 2014–16. Daughter of A. Linwood Holton Jr. and wife of Tim Kaine.

== Homans and Peabodys ==
- Endicott Peabody (1920–1997), Massachusetts Governor's Councilman 1955–56, candidate for Attorney General of Massachusetts 1956 1958, delegate to the Democratic National Convention 1960 1964 1968, candidate for Governor of Massachusetts 1960, Governor of Massachusetts 1963–65, candidate for U.S. Senate from Massachusetts 1966, candidate for U.S. Senate from New Hampshire 1986. Cousin of William P. Homans Jr.
- William P. Homans Jr. (1922–1997), Massachusetts State Representative 1963–65. Cousin of Endicott Peabody.

NOTE: William P. Homans Jr. was also nephew of Massachusetts State Senator Henry Parkman Jr.

== Honeys and Quincys ==
- Samuel R. Honey (1842–1927), Lieutenant Governor of Rhode Island 1887–88, Democratic National Committeeman 1888–96, Mayor of Newport, Rhode Island 1891–92; delegate to the Democratic National Convention 1892 1904; Rhode Island State Representative 1893–94. Father-in-law of Josiah Quincy.
  - Josiah Quincy (1859–1919), Massachusetts State Representative 1887–88 1890–91, Chairman of the Massachusetts Democratic Party 1891–92 1906, Mayor of Boston, Massachusetts 1905–09; candidate for Governor of Massachusetts 1901; delegate to the Massachusetts Constitutional Convention 1917; candidate for Attorney General of Massachusetts 1917. Son-in-law of Samuel R. Honey.

NOTE: Josiah Quincy was also great-grandson of U.S. Representative Josiah Quincy III and grandson of Boston, Massachusetts Mayor Josiah Quincy Jr.

== Hoopers ==
- William Hooper (1742–1790), Delegate to the Continental Congress from North Carolina 1774–77, member of the North Carolina Legislature 1777–78. Great-great-grandfather of Warren G. Hooper.
  - Warren G. Hooper (1904–1945), Michigan State Representative 1939–44, Michigan State Senator 1945. Great-great-grandson of William Hooper.

== Hoopers of Alabama ==
- Perry O. Hooper Sr. (1925–2016), Alabama Supreme Court 27th chief justice 1995–2001, first Republican in the position; former probate and circuit judge, father of Perry Hooper Jr.
  - Perry O. Hooper Jr. (born 1954), Republican member of the Alabama House of Representatives 1984–2003; unsuccessful candidate for Alabama Public Service Commission 2006, son of Perry Hooper Sr.

== Hoovers ==
- Charles L. Hoover (1872–1949), U.S. Consul in Madrid, Spain 1909–12; U.S. Consul in Carlsbad, Czechoslovakia 1912–14; U.S. Consul in Prague, Czechoslovakia 1914–16; U.S. Consul in Sao Paulo, Brazil 1916–20; U.S. Consul in Danzig, Poland 1922; U.S. Consul in Batavia, Indonesia 1926; U.S. Consul General in Amsterdam, Netherlands 1928–32. Distant cousin of Herbert Hoover.
- Herbert Hoover (1874–1964), candidate for the Republican nomination for President of the United States 1920, U.S. Secretary of Commerce 1921–28, President of the United States 1929–33. Distant cousin of Charles L. Hoover.
  - Herbert Hoover Jr. (1903–1969), United States Under Secretary of State 1954–57. Son of Herbert Hoover.

== Hopkinsons ==
- Francis Hopkinson (1737–1791), New Jersey Colony Councilman 1774–76, New Jersey Colony Executive Councilman 1775, Delegate to the Continental Congress from New Jersey 1776, Admiralty Court Judge in Pennsylvania, delegate to the Pennsylvania Constitutional Convention 1787, U.S. District Court Judge in Pennsylvania 1789–91. Father of Joseph Hopkinson.
  - Joseph Hopkinson (1770–1842), U.S. Representative from Pennsylvania 1815–19, New Jersey Assemblyman, U.S. District Court Judge in Pennsylvania 1828–42, Chairman of the Pennsylvania Constitutional Convention 1837. Son of Francis Hopkinson.

NOTE: Francis Hopkinson was also brother-in-law of Continental Congressional Delegate Thomas McKean. Joseph Hopkinson was also son-in-law of Pennsylvania governor Thomas Mifflin.

== Hords ==
- Francis T. Hord Sr. (1797-2869), Kentucky Circuit Court judge.
  - Oscar B. Hord (1829-1888), Indiana Attorney General 1862–1864, delegate to the 1876 Democratic National Convention and the 1884 Democratic National Convention. Son of Francis Hord Sr., older brother of Francis Hord Jr.
  - Francis T. Hord Jr. (1835-1912), Indiana Attorney General 1882–1886, Indiana Circuit Court judge 1892–1904. Son of Francis Hord Jr., brother of Oscar Hord.
    - William B. Hord (1860-?), Deputy Indiana Attorney General 1882–1887. Son of Francis Hord Jr.

== Horners and Watsons ==
- James Watson (1750–1806), New York Assemblyman 1791 1794–96, New York State Senator 1796–98, U.S. Senator from New York 1798–1800, candidate for Lieutenant Governor of New York 1801. Father-in-law of John S. Horner.
  - John S. Horner (1802–1883), Secretary of Michigan Territory 1835–36, acting Governor of Michigan Territory 1835–36, Secretary of Wisconsin Territory 1836–37, Register of the Green Bay, Wisconsin Land Office; Marquette County, Wisconsin Probate Court Judge 1849–54. Son-in-law of James Watson.

== Horseys ==
- Outerbridge Horsey (1777–1842), Delaware State Representative 1800–02, Attorney General of Delaware 1806–10, U.S. Senate from Delaware 1810–21. Great-grandfather of Outerbridge Horsey II.
  - Outerbridge Horsey II (1910–1983), U.S. Vice Consul in Madrid, Spain 1943; U.S. Ambassador to Czechoslovakia 1962–66. Great-grandson of Outerbridge Horsey.

== Houghtons ==
The Houghtons are heirs to the Corning glass fortune.

- Alanson B. Houghton 1863–1941, U.S. Representative from New York, 1919–22; U.S. Ambassador to Germany, 1922–25; U.S. Ambassador to the United Kingdom, 1925–29.
  - Amory Houghton (1899–1981), U.S. Ambassador to France, 1957–61; son of Alanson B. Houghton, father of Amo Houghton.
    - Amo Houghton (1926–2020), former CEO of Corning Glass Works; U.S. Representative from New York, 1987–2005; son of Amory Houghton.

== Houks ==
- Leonidas C. Houk (1836–1891), delegate to the Tennessee Constitutional Convention 1865, Circuit Court Judge in Tennessee 1866–70, delegate to the Republican National Convention 1868 1880 1884 1888, Tennessee State Representative 1873–75, U.S. Representative from Tennessee 1879–91. Father of John C. Houk.
  - John C. Houk (1860–1923), Secretary of the Tennessee Republican Committee, U.S. Representative from Tennessee 1891–95, Tennessee State Senator 1897–99 1911–13 1917–23. Son of Leonidas C. Houk.

== Houstons ==
- John W. Houston (1814–1896), Delaware Secretary of State 1841–44, U.S. Representative from Delaware 1845–51, Justice of the Superior Court of Delaware. Uncle of Robert G. Houston.
  - Robert G. Houston (1867–1946), Collector of Customs of Delaware 1900–04, U.S. Representative from Delaware 1925–33, candidate for U.S. Senate from Delaware 1936. Nephew of John W. Houston.

== Houstons of Delaware and Michigan ==
- Henry A. Houston (1847–1925), U.S. Representative from Delaware 1903–05. Father of Henry A. Houston.
  - Henry A. Houston (1890–1979), candidate for the Democratic nomination for U.S. Representative from Michigan 1932. Son of Henry A. Houston.

== Houstons and Hubbards ==
- Samuel Houston (1793–1863), U.S. Representative from Tennessee 1823–27, Governor of Tennessee 1827–29, President of the Republic of Texas 1836–38 1841–44, U.S. Senator from Texas 1846–59, Governor of Texas 1859–61. Father of Andrew Jackson Houston and Temple Houston.
- David Hubbard (1792–1874), Alabama State Representative 1831 1842–43 1845 1853, U.S. Representative from Alabama 1839–41 1849–51, Confederate States Representative from Alabama 1861–63, Confederate States Commissioner of Indian Affairs 1863–65. Cousin of Samuel Houston.
  - Andrew Jackson Houston (1854–1941), candidate for Governor of Texas 1892 1910 1918, U.S. Senator from Texas 1941. Son of Samuel Houston.
  - Temple Lea Houston (1860–1905), member of the Texas Senate 1885. Son of Sam Houston and Brother of Andrew Jackson Houston.
  - Price Daniel Jr. (aka Marion Price Daniel Jr.) (1941–1981) Speaker of the Texas House of Representatives, through his mother Jean Houston Baldwin, was the great-great-great-grandson of Sam Houston.

NOTE: Samuel Houston was also great-great-grandfather-in-law of U.S. Senator Price Daniel.

== Houxs and Prices ==
- Sterling Price (1809–1867), member of the Missouri Legislature, U.S. Representative from Missouri 1845–46, Governor of Missouri 1853–57. Distant cousin of Frank L. Houx.
- Frank L. Houx (1854–1941), Mayor of Cody, Wyoming 1901 1905–09; Wyoming Secretary of State 1911–19; Governor of Wyoming 1917–19. Distant cousin of Sterling Price.

== Howards ==
- John Eager Howard (1752–1827), Delegate to the Continental Congress from Maryland 1788, Governor of Maryland 1789–91, Maryland State Senator 1791–95, U.S. Senator from Maryland 1796–1803, candidate for Vice President of the United States 1816. Father of George Howard and Benjamin Chew Howard.
- Charles Carnan Ridgely (1760–1829), Maryland House Delegate 1790–95, Maryland State Senator 1796–1800, Governor of Maryland 1816–19. Father-in-law of George Howard.
  - George Howard (1789–1846), Governor of Maryland 1831–33. Son of John Eager Howard.
  - Benjamin Chew Howard (1791–1872), Baltimore, Maryland Councilman 1820; Maryland House Delegate 1824; U.S. Representative from Maryland 1829–33 1835–39; candidate for Governor of Maryland 1861. Son of John Eager Howard.

== Howards of Georgia ==
- Henry Howard Sr.
- Earnestine Howard
- Henry Howard Jr.
- Karlton Howard

== Howards of Nebraska ==
- Edgar Howard (1858–1951), Lieutenant Governor of Nebraska 1917–19, U.S. Representative from Nebraska 1923–35, delegate to the Democratic National Convention 1944. Father of Findley B. Howard.
  - Findley B. Howard, U.S. Minister to Paraguay 1935–41. Son of Edgar Howard.

== Howes ==
See Howe family (United States politicians)

== Howells ==
- Elias Howell (1792–1844), Ohio State Senator 1830–32, U.S. Representative from Ohio 1835–37. Father of James B. Howell.
  - James B. Howell (1816–1880), delegate to the Republican National Convention 1856, Postmaster of Keokuk, Iowa 1861–66; U.S. Senator from Iowa 1870–71; Commissioner of the Court of Southern Claims 1871–80. Son of Elias Howell.

== Howells of Michigan and Nebraska ==
- Andrew Howell, Michigan State Senator 1865 1867, Circuit Court Judge in Michigan 1862–67. Father of Robert B. Howell.
  - Robert B. Howell (1864–1933), Nebraska State Senator 1902–04, Republican National Committeeman 1912–24, candidate for Governor of Nebraska 1914, U.S. Senator from Nebraska 1923–33. Son of Andrew Howell.

== Howells of Rhode Island ==
- David Howell (1747–1824), Rhode Island State Court Judge 1780, Delegate to the Continental Congress from Rhode Island 1782–85, Justice of the Rhode Island Supreme Court 1786, Attorney General of Rhode Island 1789–90, U.S. Federal Judge 1812–24. Father of Jeremiah B. Howell.
  - Jeremiah B. Howell (1771–1822), U.S. Senator from Rhode Island 1811–17. Son of David Howell.

== Howeys, Carpenters, and Strattons ==
- Charles C. Stratton (1796–1859), New Jersey Assemblyman 1821 1823 1829, U.S. Representative from New Jersey 1837–39 1841–43, delegate to the New Jersey Constitutional Convention 1844, Governor of New Jersey 1845–48. Uncle of Benjamin Franklin Howey and Thomas Preston Carpenter.
  - Benjamin Franklin Howey (1828–1895), Sheriff of Warren County, New Jersey 1878–81; U.S. Representative from New Jersey 1883–85. Nephew of Charles C. Stratton.
  - Thomas Preston Carpenter, Justice of the New Jersey Supreme Court. Nephew of Charles C. Stratton.

== Hoyts ==
- Henry M. Hoyt (1830–1892), delegate to the Republican National Convention 1868, Chairman of the Pennsylvania Republican Party 1875–76, Governor of Pennsylvania 1879–83. Father of Henry M. Hoyt.
  - Henry M. Hoyt (1856–1910), U.S. Solicitor General. Son of Henry M. Hoyt.

NOTE: Henry M. Hoyt was also son-in-law of Philadelphia, Pennsylvania Mayor Morton McMichael.

== Hubbards ==
- Asahel W. Hubbard (1819–1879), Indiana State Representative 1847–49, Judge in Iowa 1859–62, U.S. Representative from Iowa 1863–69. Father of Elbert H. Hubbard.
  - Elbert H. Hubbard (1849–1912), Iowa State Representative 1882, Iowa State Senator 1900–02, U.S. Representative from Iowa 1905–12. Son of Asahel W. Hubbard.

== Hubbards of West Virginia ==
- Chester D. Hubbard (1814–1891), Virginia House Delegate 1852–53, West Virginia State Senator 1863–64, delegate to the Republican National Convention 1864 1880, U.S. Representative from West Virginia 1865–69. Father of William P. Hubbard.
  - William P. Hubbard (1843–1921), West Virginia House Delegate 1881–82, delegate to the Republican National Convention 1888 1912, candidate for Attorney General of West Virginia 1888, candidate for U.S. Representative from West Virginia 1890, U.S. Representative from West Virginia 1907–11. Son of Chester D. Hubbard.

== Hucks and Lagoas ==
- Paul Huck (born 1940), Judge of the United States District Court for the Southern District of Florida 2000–10.
  - Barbara Lagoa (born 1967), Judge of the Florida Third District Court of Appeal 2006–19, Justice of the Supreme Court of Florida 2019, Judge of the United States Court of Appeals for the Eleventh Circuit 2019–present. Daughter-in-law of Paul Huck.

== Huckabees ==
- Mike Huckabee, Lieutenant Governor of Arkansas from 193-1996, Governor of Arkansas from 1996-2007, Republican presidential candidate in 2008 and 2016, and the 29th United States Ambassador to Israel 2025-present.
  - Sarah Huckabee Sanders, White House Press Secretary 2017-2019 and Governor of Arkansas since 2023. Daughter of Mike Huckabee.

== Huddlestons ==
- George Huddleston (1869–1960), U.S. Representative from Alabama 1915–37. Father of George Huddleston Jr.
  - George Huddleston Jr. (1920–1971), U.S. Representative from Alabama 1963–65. Son of George Huddleston.

== Huffingtons ==
- Roy M. Huffington (1917–2008), U.S. Ambassador to Austria 1990–93. Father of Michael Huffington.
  - Michael Huffington (born 1947), U.S. Representative from California 1993–95, candidate for U.S. Senate from California 1994. Son of Roy M. Huffington.
  - Arianna Huffington (born 1950), candidate for Governor of California 2003. Former wife of Michael Huffington.

== Hugers ==
- Daniel Huger (1742–1799), South Carolina Colony Assemblyman 1773–75, Justice of the Peace in South Carolina Colony 1775, South Carolina State Representative 1778–80, South Carolina Governor's Councilman 1780, Delegate to the Continental Congressman 1786–88, U.S. Representative from South Carolina 1789–93. Father of Daniel Elliott Huger.
  - Daniel Elliott Huger (1779–1854), South Carolina Circuit Court Judge 1819–30, South Carolina State Senator 1830–32 1838–42, U.S. Senator from South Carolina 1843–45. Son of Daniel Huger.

== Hughes ==
- William J. Hughes (1932–2019), candidate for U.S. Representative from New Jersey 1970, U.S. Representative from New Jersey 1975–95, U.S. Ambassador to Panama 1995–98. Father of Billy Hughes.
  - Billy Hughes, candidate for New Jersey State Senate 2001. Son of William J. Hughes.

== Hughes of Massachusetts and New York ==
- Charles Evans Hughes (1862–1948), Governor of New York 1907–10, candidate for the Republican nomination for President of the United States 1908, Justice of the U.S. Supreme Court 1910–16, candidate for President of the United States 1916, U.S. Secretary of States 1921–25, Chief Justice of the U.S. Supreme Court 1930–41. Grandfather of H. Stuart Hughes.
  - Charles Evans Hughes Jr. (1889–1950), Solicitor General 1929–30. Son of Charles Evans Hughes.
    - H. Stuart Hughes (1916–1999), candidate for U.S. Senate from Massachusetts 1962. Son of Charles Evans Hughes Jr.

== Hughes and Murphys ==
- Richard J. Hughes (1909–1992), candidate for U.S. Representative from New Jersey 1938, Chairman of the Mercer County, New Jersey Democratic Party 1944–45; County Judge in New Jersey 1948–52; New Jersey Superior Court Judge 1952–61; Governor of New Jersey 1962–70; delegate to the Democratic National Convention 1968 1972; Democratic National Committeeman 1970–73; Chief Justice of the New Jersey Supreme Court 1973–81. Father of Brian M. Hughes.
  - Brian M. Hughes, candidate for U.S. Representative from New Jersey 1992, delegate to the Democratic National Convention 2004. Son of Richard J. Hughes.
  - Michael Murphy, candidate for Democratic nomination for Governor of New Jersey 1993. Stepson of Richard J. Hughes.
  - Marianne Espinosa Murphy, New Jersey Superior Court Judge. Wife of Michael Murphy.

== Hulls ==
- John A.T. Hull (1841–1928), Iowa Secretary of State 1878–84, Lieutenant Governor of Iowa 1886–90, U.S. Representative from Iowa 1891–1911. Father of John A. Hull.
  - John A. Hull (1874–1944), Justice of the Philippines Supreme Court 1932–36. Son of John A.T. Hull.

== Humphreys ==
- H.H. Humphrey (1882–1949), Chairman of the Spink County, South Dakota Democratic Party 1928; delegate to the Democratic National Convention 1928 1948. Father of Hubert H. Humphrey Jr.
  - Hubert H. Humphrey Jr. (1911–1978), mayor of Minneapolis, 1945–48; U.S. Senator from Minnesota, 1949–64 and 1971–78; 38th Vice President, 1965–69; candidate for Democratic nomination for president, 1960 and 1972; Democratic nominee for president, 1968.
  - Muriel Humphrey (1912–1998), wife of Hubert Humphrey Jr., appointed to the U.S. Senate upon his death in 1978 to complete his term.
    - Hubert H. "Skip" Humphrey III (born 1942), attorney general of Minnesota, 1983–99, candidate for governor, 1998; son of Hubert and Muriel Humphrey.
      - Hubert H. "Buck" Humphrey IV; candidate for Minnesota Secretary of State, 2002.

== Humphreys of Mississippi ==
- Benjamin G. Humphreys (1808–1882), Governor of Mississippi 1865–68. Father of Benjamin G. Humphreys II.
  - Benjamin G. Humphreys II (1865–1923), District Attorney in Mississippi 1895–1903, U.S. Representative from Mississippi 1903–23, delegate to the Democratic National Convention 1920. Son of Benjamin G. Humphreys.
    - William Y. Humphreys (1890–1933), U.S. Representative from Mississippi 1923–25, Prosecuting Attorney of Washington County, Mississippi 1928–33. Son of Benjamin G. Humphreys II.

== Hunters ==
- Duncan L. Hunter (born 1948), U.S. Representative from California 1981–2009, candidate for the Republican nomination for President of the United States 2008. Father of Duncan D. Hunter.
  - Duncan D. Hunter (born 1976), U.S. Representative from California 2009–2020. Son of Duncan L. Hunter.

== Hunters of Rhode Island ==
- William Hunter (1774–1849), Rhode Island State Representative 1799 1811–12, U.S. Senator from Rhode Island 1811–21, U.S. Chargé d'Affaires to Brazil 1834–41, U.S. Minister to Brazil 1841–43. Father of William Hunter.
  - William Hunter (1805–1886), acting U.S. Secretary of State 1853 1860. Son of William Hunter.

== Hunts ==
- William H. Hunt (1823–1884), Attorney General of Louisiana 1876, Judge of the U.S. Court of Claims 1878, U.S. Secretary of the Navy 1881–82, U.S. Minister to Russia 1882–84. Father of William Henry Hunt.
  - William Henry Hunt (1857–1949), delegate to the Montana Territory Constitutional Convention 1884, Attorney General of Montana Territory 1885–87, member of the Montana Territory Legislature 1888–89, District Court Judge in Montana 1889–94, Justice of the Montana Supreme Court 1894–1900, Puerto Rico Secretary of State 1900–01, Governor of Puerto Rico 1901–04, U.S. District Court Judge in Montana 1904–10, Judge of the U.S. Court of Customs Appeals 1910–11, Judge of the U.S. Commerce Court 1911. Son of William H. Hunt.

== Hunts of North Carolina ==
- James Baxter Hunt Jr. (born 1937), 27th Lieutenant Governor of North Carolina (1973–1977), 69th and 71st Governor of North Carolina 1977–1985 and 1993–2001
- Carolyn Leonard Hunt (born 1937), Second Lady of North Carolina 1973–1977, Member of the Wilson County Public School Board 1986–1990, First Lady of North Carolina 1977–1985 and 1993–2001; wife of James Baxter Hunt Jr.
  - James Baxter Hunt III, Chargé d'Affaires at the United States Embassy in Chile 2019–2020, United States Consul General in Toronto in 2023; son of James Sr. and Carolyn
  - Rachel Henderson Hunt (born 1965), member of the North Carolina House of Representatives (2019–2023), member of the North Carolina Senate (2023–2025), 36th Lieutenant Governor of North Carolina (2025); daughter of James Sr. and Carolyn

== Hunts and Gaillards ==
- John Gaillard (1765–1826), South Carolina State Representative 1794–96, South Carolina State Senator 1796–1804, U.S. Senator from South Carolina 1804–26. Uncle of Theodroe Gaillard Hunt.
  - Theodore Gaillard Hunt (1805–1893), District Attorney of New Orleans, Louisiana; Louisiana State Representative 1837–53; U.S. Representative from Louisiana 1853–55; Judge in Louisiana. Nephew of John Gaillard.
    - Carleton Hunt (1836–1921), U.S. Representative from Louisiana 1883–85. Nephew of Theodore Gaillard Hunt.

== Hunts and Savages ==
- John Savage (1779–1863), U.S. Representative from New York 1815–19, New York State Comptroller 1821–23, Chief Justice of the New York Supreme Court 1823–37.
  - Ward Hunt (1810–1886), Chief Judge of the New York Court of Appeals 1868–69, Associate Justice of the Supreme Court of the United States 1872–82. Son-in-law of John Savage.

== Huntsmans ==
- Jon Huntsman Sr. (1937-2018), businessman who served as the White House Staff Secretary 1971–1972. Father of Jon Huntsman Jr.
  - Jon Huntsman Jr. (born 1960), U.S. Ambassador to Singapore 1992–1993; U.S. Deputy Trade Representative 2001–2003; 16th Governor of Utah 2005–2009; U.S. Ambassador to China 2009–2011; candidate for President of the United States in 2012; U.S. Ambassador to Russia 2017–2019; candidate for Governor of Utah in the 2020 election. Son of Jon Huntsman Sr.

== Huntingtons ==
See Huntington family

- Samuel Huntington (Scotland, Connecticut 1731–1796), Connecticut Superior Court Judge 1773–1785, Patriot in the American Revolution, Founding Father and Signer of the Declaration of Independence, President of and Delegate to the Continental Congress from Connecticut 1776–1784, Deputy Governor of Connecticut 1784–1786, Governor of Connecticut 1786–1796. Uncle and adoptive father of Samuel Huntington.
- Jedediah Huntington (or Jedidiah Huntington) (Norwich, Connecticut 4 August 1743 – 25 September 1818), was an American brigadier general who served under General George Washington in the Continental Army during the American Revolutionary War. After the war, he served in numerous civilian posts.
- Ebenezer Huntington (26 December 1754 – 17 June 1834) was an officer in the Continental Army and is depicted as one of the officers of General Washington's Army in John Trumbull's Surrender of Lord Cornwallis. He served as a United States representative from Connecticut after the war.
- Jabez Huntington (7 August 1719 – 5 October 1786) was a merchant and politician from Connecticut Colony. Jabez Huntington graduated from Yale in 1741, engaged in the West India trade, and amassed a fortune. After 1759 he was frequently a member of the legislature, speaker for several years, and also a member of the council.
- Jabaz W. Huntington (Norwich, Connecticut 8 November 1788 – 1 November 1847) was a United States representative and Senator from Connecticut.
- Samuel Huntington (1765–1817), delegate to the Ohio Constitutional Convention 1802, Justice of the Ohio Supreme Court 1803–1808, Governor of Ohio 1808–1810. Nephew of and adoptive son of Samuel Huntington (1731–1796).
- Elisha Mills Huntington (1806–1862), Indiana United States Representative 1832–1836, Indiana Circuit Court Judge 1837–1841, Judge of the U.S. District Court of Indiana 1842–1862, delegate to the Democratic National Convention 1860. Descendant of Samuel Huntington.
- Nathaniel Huntington, Indiana United States Representative 1827–1828. Brother of Elisha Mills Huntington.
- Samuel Phillips Huntington (18 April 1927 – 24 December 2008) was an American political scientist, adviser and academic. He spent more than half a century at Harvard University, where he was director of Harvard's Center for International Affairs and the Albert J. Weatherhead III University Professor. During the Presidency of Jimmy Carter, Huntington was the White House Coordinator of Security Planning for the National Security Council. He is best known for his 1993 theory, the "Clash of Civilizations", of a post-Cold War new world order.

== Hustings and Juneaus ==
- Solomon Juneau (1793–1856), Mayor of Milwaukee, Wisconsin 1846–47. Grandfather of Paul O. Husting.
  - Paul O. Husting (1866–1917), District Attorney of Dodge County, Wisconsin 1903–06; Wisconsin State Senator 1907–14; U.S. Senator from Wisconsin 1915–17. Grandson of Solomon Laurent Juneau.

== Hutchins ==
- John Hutchins (1812–1891), Clerk of Common Pleas Court of Trumbull County, Ohio 1838–43; Ohio State Representative 1849–50; Mayor of Warren, Ohio; member of the Warren, Ohio Board of Education; U.S. Representative from Ohio 1859–63. Cousin of Wells A. Hutchins.
- Wells A. Hutchins (1818–1895), Ohio State Representative 1852–53, Solicitor of Portsmouth, Ohio 1857–61; candidate for U.S. Representative from Ohio 1860 1880; U.S. Representative from Ohio 1863–65. Cousin of John Hutchins.

== Hutchinsons and Hendrens ==
- Tim Hutchinson (born 1949), U.S. Representative from Arkansas, 1993–97; U.S. Senator from Arkansas, 1997–2003; brother of Asa Hutchinson.
- Asa Hutchinson (born 1950), Governor of Arkansas from 2015 to 2023, U.S. Representative from Arkansas, 1997–2001; administrator of the Drug Enforcement Administration, 2001–03; Undersecretary for Border & Transportation Security for the Department of Homeland Security, 2003–05; brother of Tim Hutchinson.
- Donna Hutchinson (born 1949), member of the Arkansas State Legislature from 2007 to 2013, first Native American woman elected to the Arkansas General Assembly. Ex-wife of Tim Hutchinson.
  - Jeremy Hutchinson, Arkansas State Representative from 2000 to 2007; member of the Arkansas State Senate from 2011 to 2018; first Native American elected to the Arkansas General Assembly; Son of Tim and Donna Hutchinson.
  - Timothy Chad Hutchinson, Arkansas State Representative from 2005 to 2011. Son of Tim and Donna Hutchinson and twin brother of Jeremy Hutchinson.
- Kim Hendren, former member of the Arkansas State Senate and the Arkansas House of Representatives, brother-in-law of Tim and Asa Hutchinson, uncle-by-marriage of Jeremy and Timothy Hutchinson
  - Jim Hendren, member of the Arkansas State Senate from District 2 in Benton County from 2013 to 2023, President pro tempore of the Arkansas Senate from 2019 to 2021; member of the Arkansas House of Representatives from 1995 to 2001; son of Kim Hendren, maternal nephew of Tim and Asa Hutchinson, brother of Gayla and Hope, first cousin of Jeremy and Timothy Chad Hutchinson, former nephew by marriage of Donna Hutchinson.
  - Gayla Hendren McKenzie, member of the Arkansas House of Representatives from District 92 in Benton County; unsuccessfully ran to succeed her brother Jim Hendren in the Arkansas Senate; daughter of Kim, niece of Tim and Asa, and sister of Jim and Hope.
  - Hope Hendren Duke, member of the Arkansas House of Representatives from District 12 in Benton County since 2023; daughter of Kim, niece of Tim and Asa, and sister of Jim and Gayla.

== Hydes ==
- Ira B. Hyde (1838–1926), U.S. Representative from Missouri 1873–75, delegate to the Republican National Convention 1884. Father of Arthur M. Hyde and Laurance M. Hyde.
  - Arthur M. Hyde (1877–1947), Governor of Missouri 1921–25, U.S. Secretary of Agriculture 1929–33. Son of Ira B. Hyde.
  - Laurance M. Hyde (1892–1978), Justice of the Missouri Supreme Court 1943–66. Son of Ira B. Hyde.
  - C. Horace Cullers (1885–1965), delegate to the Democratic National Convention 1944. Brother-in-law of Arthur M. Hyde.
    - Robert H. Frazier, Mayor of Greensboro, North Carolina 1951–55. Son-in-law of Laurance M. Hyde.

== Hydes of Connecticut ==
- Loren P. Waldo (1802–1881), Connecticut State Representative 1832–34 1839 1847–48, Probate Court Judge in Connecticut 1842–43, U.S. Representative from Connecticut 1849–51, Superior Court Judge in Connecticut 1856–63. Father-in-law of Alvan P. Hyde.
  - Alvan P. Hyde (1825–1894), delegate to the Democratic National Convention 1892. Son-in-law of Loren P. Waldo.
    - Frank E. Hyde, Connecticut State Representative 1890, U.S. Consul in Lyon, France 1893–97. Son of Alvan P. Hyde.
    - William Waldo Hyde, Mayor of Hartford, Connecticut 1892–94; candidate for Mayor of Hartford, Connecticut 1900. Son of Alvan P. Hyde.
