= Susan Holmes (politician) =

American politician (1942–2025)

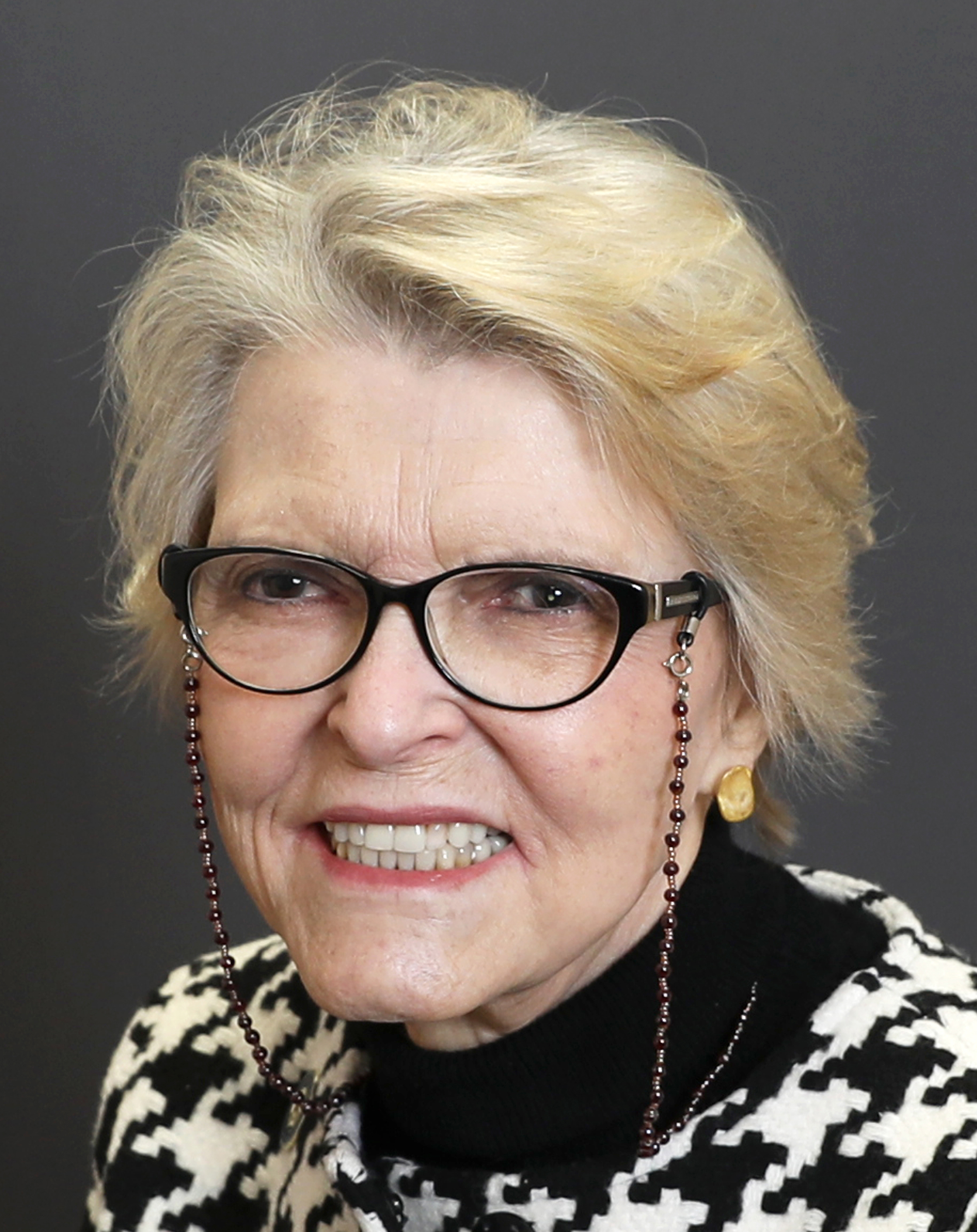

Member of the Georgia House of Representatives
- In office January 10, 2011 – January 9, 2023
- Preceded by: Jim Cole
- Succeeded by: Clint Crowe (Redistricting)
- Constituency: 125th District (2011-2013); 129th District (2013-2023)

Mayor of Monticello, Georgia
- In office 1998–2010

Personal details
- Born: October 8, 1942 Jasper County, Georgia, U.S.
- Died: April 30, 2025 (aged 82) Monticello, Georgia, U.S.
- Party: Republican
- Spouse: Paul Holmes
- Children: 3
- Occupation: Politician, farmer, teacher, postmaster
- Known for: First woman mayor of Monticello, Georgia

Susan Holmes (October 8, 1942 – April 30, 2025) was an American politician, farmer, teacher and postmaster from Georgia. Holmes served as a Republican member of the Georgia House of Representatives from 2011 to 2023.

== Early life and education ==
Holmes was born in Jasper County, Georgia and graduated from Monticello High School.

Holmes earned a Bachelor of Science degree in Business Education from University of Georgia.

== Career ==
Holmes was a cotton and dairy farmer in Jasper County, Georgia. Holmes was a teacher and postmaster.

In 1998, Holmes became the first woman mayor of Monticello, Georgia, until 2010.

In January 2007, Holmes was appointed by President George W. Bush as the State Executive Director of the Farm Service Agency for Georgia.

On November 2, 2010, Holmes won the election and became a Republican member of Georgia House of Representatives for District 125. Holmes defeated David Gault with 64.74% of the votes. On November 6, 2012, Holmes won the election unopposed and became a Republican member of Georgia House of Representatives for District 129. On November 4, 2014, as an incumbent, Holmes won the election unopposed and continued serving District 129. On November 8, 2016, as an incumbent, Holmes won the election unopposed and continued serving District 129. On November 6, 2018, as an incumbent, Holmes won the election unopposed and continued serving District 129. On November 3, 2020, as an incumbent, Holmes won the election and continued serving District 129. Holmes defeated Sharonda Bell and Joe Reed with 69.61% of the votes.

== Personal life and death ==
Holmes's husband was Paul Holmes. They had three children. Holmes and her family lived in Monticello, Georgia. Holmes was initially slated to sign as a Georgia False Elector, but refused to join. Georgia False Electors were recruited by the Georgia Republican Party to support Donald Trump's failed effort to subvert the results of the 2020 presidential election.

Holmes died at a nursing home in Monticello, on April 30, 2025, at the age of 82.

== Awards ==
- 2001 Citizen of The Year. Presented by Monticello-Jasper County Chamber of Commerce.

Georgia House of Representatives
Preceded by Jim Cole	Member of the Georgia House of Representatives from the 125th district 2011–2013	Succeeded by Earnest Smith
Preceded by Kip Smith	Member of the Georgia House of Representatives from the 129th district 2013–2023	Succeeded by Karlton Howard
