= Trey Rhodes =

American politician

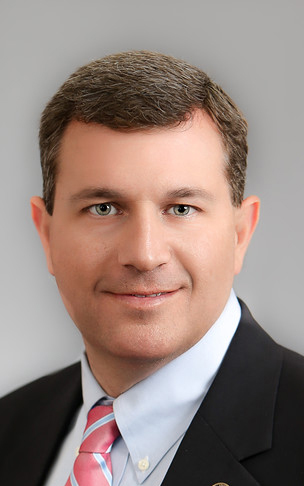
- Official headshot

Member of the Georgia House of Representatives
- Incumbent
- Assumed office February 10, 2015
- Preceded by: Mickey Channell
- Constituency: 120th District (2015–2023); 124th District (2023–Present)

Personal details
- Born: Ralph Lanier Rhodes; February 9, 1975 (age 51) Union Point, Georgia, U.S.
- Party: Republican

Ralph Lanier Rhodes (born February 9, 1975) is an American politician who has served in the Georgia House of Representatives from the 120th district since 2015.

Georgia House of Representatives
Preceded by Mickey Channell	Member of the Georgia House of Representatives from the 120th district 2015–2023	Succeeded by Houston Gaines
Preceded by Henry Howard	Member of the Georgia House of Representatives from the 124th district 2023–Present	Incumbent
