= Earnestine Howard =

American politician (1951–2015)

Member of the Georgia House of Representatives from the 121st district
- In office November 17, 2005 – January 8, 2007
- Preceded by: Henry Howard Sr.
- Succeeded by: Henry Howard Jr.

Personal details
- Born: 1951
- Died: 2015 (aged 63–64)
- Party: Democratic
- Spouse: Henry Howard Sr.
- Children: Henry Howard Jr. (step-son); Karlton Howard (step-son)

Earnestine Howard (1951–2015) was an American politician from Georgia. She served as a member of the Georgia House of Representatives.
