= Henry Howard Sr. =

American politician (1930–2005)

Member of the Georgia House of Representatives
- In office January 14, 1991 – October 3, 2005
- Preceded by: Charles Walker
- Succeeded by: Earnestine Howard
- Constituency: 85th district (1991–1993); 118th district (1993–2003); 98th district (2003–2005); 121st district (2005)

Personal details
- Born: Henry Lee Howard; June 18, 1930
- Died: October 3, 2005 (aged 75)
- Party: Democratic
- Spouse: Earnestine Howard
- Children: Henry Howard; Karlton Howard

Henry Lee Howard (June 18, 1930 – October 3, 2005) was an American politician from Georgia.
