= Mickey Channell =

American politician (1942–2019)

Robert Melvin (Mickey) Channell

Member of the Georgia House of Representatives from the 120th district
- In office 1992–2015
- Succeeded by: Trey Rhodes

Personal details
- Born: September 9, 1942 Washington, Georgia, U.S.
- Died: February 26, 2019 (aged 76)
- Party: Democratic, Republican (Nov.2006–present)
- Occupation: Business Owner, politician

Robert Melvin (Mickey) Channell, Jr. (September 9, 1942 – February 26, 2019) was an American politician from Georgia. Channell was a Republican member of the Georgia House of Representatives from the 120th District from 1992 to 2015.

During his 22 years in the Georgia General Assembly, Channell served as Chairman of the House Ways and Means Committee, Vice-Chairman of Appropriations, Chairman of the Health Subcommittee of Appropriations, Chairman of Industrial Relations and Secretary of Transportation. He also served on Health and Human Services, Human Relations and Aging, and Rules. Channell worked on healthcare-related legislation in Georgia, in Georgia General Assembly he authored the PeachCare for Kids legislation, securing affordable healthcare services for children of Georgia’s working families. A supporter of rural hospitals, Mr. Channell played a role in making it possible for St. Mary’s Good Samaritan Hospital to locate in Greene County. He was named Legislator of the Year by James Magazine in 2014 and one of Georgia Trend’s 100 Most Influential Georgians in 2014,.

Channell died on February 26, 2019.
