= Charles Walker (Georgia politician) =

American politician (1947–2026)

Majority Leader of the Georgia State Senate
- In office January 13, 1997 – January 13, 2003
- Preceded by: Sonny Perdue
- Succeeded by: Tom Price

Member of the Georgia State Senate from the 22nd district
- In office January 14, 1991 – January 13, 2003
- Preceded by: Thomas Allgood
- Succeeded by: Randy Hall

Member of the Georgia House of Representatives from the 85th district
- In office January 10, 1983 – January 14, 1991
- Preceded by: R.A. Dent
- Succeeded by: Henry Howard Sr.

Personal details
- Born: Charles Will Walker; November 8, 1947 Augusta, Georgia, U.S.
- Died: August 18, 2026 (aged 78) Augusta, Georgia, U.S.
- Party: Democratic

Charles Will Walker (November 8, 1947 – August 18, 2026) was an American politician who was a state senator in the legislature of Georgia. He was first elected in 1990. In 1996, he became Georgia's first African-American Senate Majority Leader. Walker was a Democrat and was from Augusta, Georgia.

== Life and career ==
Walker owned a myriad of small enterprises under the name The Walker Group. One of Walker's first ventures was a convenience store called "Reklaw's", which is Walker spelled backwards.

He started a newspaper called the Augusta Focus which served Augusta's black community. It often expressed opposing viewpoints to Augusta's only daily newspaper, the Augusta Chronicle.

Convicted in 2005 by a federal court in Augusta on charges including tax evasion, mail fraud, theft, misusing campaign funds, and conspiracy (127 counts, in all), Walker was serving a ten-year sentence at a Federal Correctional Institution in Estill, South Carolina. His projected release date was September 26, 2022.

An appeal of his convictions was rejected on July 6, 2007.

Walker filed a petition for habeas corpus in March 2009. The federal judge who presided over his trial recused himself from presiding over Walker's petition in May 2009.

Walker was released from custody in late 2016. He died on August 18, 2026, at the age of 78.
