= Georgia's 120th House of Representatives district =

State district in Georgia, USA

Georgia's 120th State House of Representatives district
Representative
Houston Gaines; R–Athens
- Demographics: 62.1% White; 29.8% Black; 5.8% Hispanic; 0.7% Asian
- Population: 53,727

District 120 elects one member of the Georgia House of Representatives. It contains parts of Barrow County, Clarke County, Jackson County and Oconee County.

== Members ==
- Mickey Channell (1992–2015)
- Trey Rhodes (2015–2023)
- Houston Gaines (since 2023)
