= Georgia's 124th House of Representatives district =

State district in Georgia, USA

Georgia's 124th State House of Representatives district
Representative
Trey Rhodes; R–Greensboro
- Demographics: 35.6% White; 57.8% Black; 2.7% Hispanic; 2.1% Asian
- Population: 51,349

District 124 elects one member of the Georgia House of Representatives. It contains the entirety of Greene County, Oglethorpe County and Taliaferro County, as well as parts of Clarke County and Putnam County.

== Members ==
- Henry Howard (2013–2022)
- Trey Rhodes (since 2023)
