= Georgia's 129th House of Representatives district =

State district in Georgia, USA

Georgia's 129th State House of Representatives district
Representative
Karlton Howard; D–Augusta
- Demographics: 67.9% White; 26.9% Black; 2.9% Hispanic; 0.7% Asian
- Population: 52,554

District 129 elects one member of the Georgia House of Representatives. It contains parts of Richmond County.

== Members ==
- Susan Holmes (2013–2023)
- Karlton Howard (since 2023)
