= Heard-Hawes family =

The Heard-Hawes family is a family of politicians from the United States.

- Stephen Heard 1740-1815, Governor of Georgia 1780-1781, Georgia State Representative 1794-1795.
  - George Washington Heard 1781-1836, Georgia State Representative 1824-1827. Son of Stephen Heard.
  - Barnard Carroll Heard, Georgia State Representative 1822-1823. Son of Stephen Heard.
  - Thomas Jefferson Heard 1801-1876, Georgia State Representative 1832-1833, Georgia State Senator 1835-1836. Son of Stephen Heard.
  - Singleton Walthall Allen 1793-1853, Georgia State Representative 1828-1831, Georgia State Senator 1838 1845-1846. Son-in-law of Stephen Heard.
    - James Lawrence Heard 1832-1922, Georgia State Representative. Son of Thomas Jefferson Heard.
    - Robert Middleton Heard 1836-1910, Georgia State Representative 1884-1885. Son of Thomas Jefferson Heard.
    - William Henry Heard 1845-1897, Georgia State Representative 1890-1891. Son of Thomas Jefferson Heard.
    - Luther H.O. Martin, Sr. 1821-1866, Georgia State Representative 1853-1854. Son-in-law of Thomas Jefferson Heard.
    - Young L.G. Harris 1812-1894, Georgia State Representative 1841 1847-1852. Son-in-law of Singleton Walthall Allen.
    - William McPherson McIntosh 1815-1862, Georgia State Representative 1846-1847, Georgia State Senator 1855-1856, Presidential Elector from Georgia 1860. Son-in-law of Singleton Walthall Allen.
    - William H. Mattox 1836-1900, Georgia State Representative 1865-1866, delegate to the Georgia Constitutional Convention 1877, Georgia State Senator 1880-1881. Son-in-law of Singleton Walthall Allen.
      - Buddy Clay Wall 1847-1930, Mayor of North Augusta, South Carolina. Son-in-law of William McPherson McIntosh.
      - William H. Heard 1850-1937, South Carolina State Senator 1876-1877, U.S. Minister to Liberia 1895-1898. Grandson of Thomas Jefferson Heard.
      - Luther H.O. Martin, Jr., Georgia State Representative 1902-1908. Son of Luther H.O. Martin, Sr.
      - Phillip W. Davis, Georgia State Senator 1882-1883, Georgia State Representative 1888-1889. Grandson-in-law of Thomas Jefferson Heard.
        - Peyton M. Hawes, Georgia State Representative 1900-1903 1907-1908. Grandson-in-law of Singleton Walthall Allen.
        - Willis Adams 1861-1913, Georgia State Representative 1905-1908. Grandson-in-law of Singleton Walthall Allen.
        - A.A. McCurry, Georgia State Senator. Great-grandson-in-law of Singleton Walthall Allen.
          - Albert Sidney Hawes 1863-1936, Georgia State Representative 1926-1927. Great grandson-in-law of Singleton Walthall Allen.
            - Peyton Samuel Hawes, Georgia State Representative 1831-1932. Great-great grandson of Singleton Walthall Allen.

NOTE: Singleton Walthall Allen was also nephew of Georgia State Senator Beverly Allen. Robert Middleton Heard's son, Luther, was also son-in-law of U.S. Senator Asbury Latimer. Young L.G. Harris was also nephew of Georgia State Senator Jeptha Vining Harris and first cousin once removed of U.S. Representative Tinsley W. Rucker Jr. Willis Adams was also son of Georgia State Representative Richard E. Adams.

== See also ==
- List of United States political families
