= Henry Howard (Georgia politician) =

American politician (1955–2022)

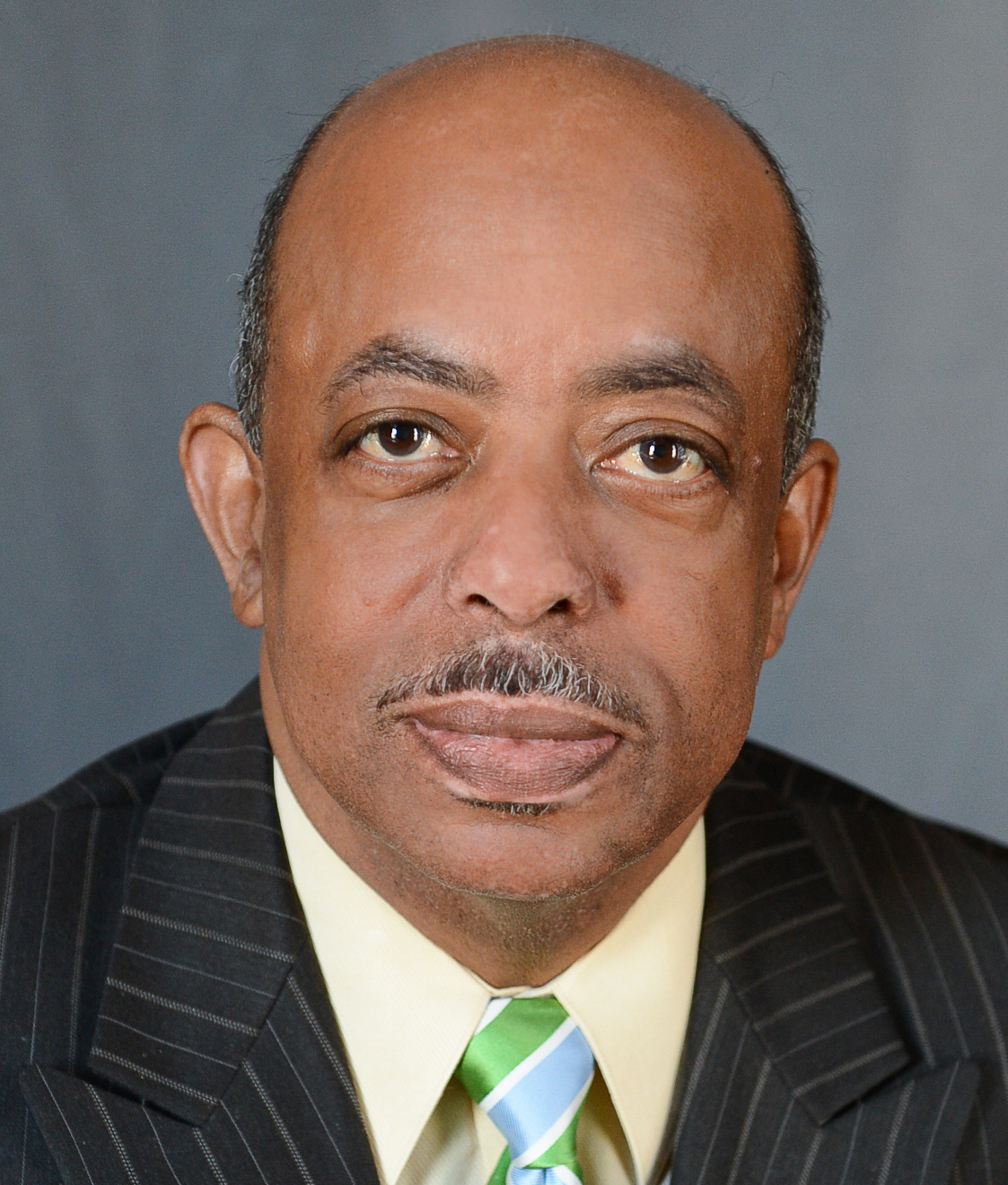

Member of the Georgia House of Representatives
- In office January 8, 2007 – October 13, 2022
- Preceded by: Earnestine Howard
- Succeeded by: Karlton Howard (Redistricting)
- Constituency: 121st District (2007–2013); 124th District (2013–2022)

Personal details
- Born: September 1, 1955 Augusta, Georgia, U.S.
- Died: October 13, 2022 (aged 67) Augusta, Georgia, U.S.
- Party: Democratic
- Spouse: Cassandria
- Relations: Karlton Howard (brother)
- Parent(s): Henry Howard (father); Earnestine Howard (step-mother)

Henry Wayne Howard (September 1, 1955 – October 13, 2022) was a member of the Georgia House of Representatives from the 124th District, serving since 2019 as a member of the Democratic Party. Howard served as a member of the Appropriations, Education, Health & Services, Juvenile Justice, and Motor Vehicles committees.

== Election ==
In 2006, Henry "Wayne" Howard's father, Henry Howard, died in the midst of his term representing Georgia House District 121. The Henry senior's wife (Wayne Howard's step-mother), Earnestine Howard, ran unopposed and won the seat. The following term, Wayne ran against Earnestine for the seat.

Howard was replaced in a special election by his brother Karlton Howard.

Georgia House of Representatives
Preceded by Earnestine Howard	Member of the Georgia House of Representatives from the 121st district 2007–2013	Succeeded by Barry Fleming
Preceded by Helen Hudson	Member of the Georgia House of Representatives from the 124th district 2013–2022	Succeeded by Trey Rhodes
