= Karlton Howard =

American politician

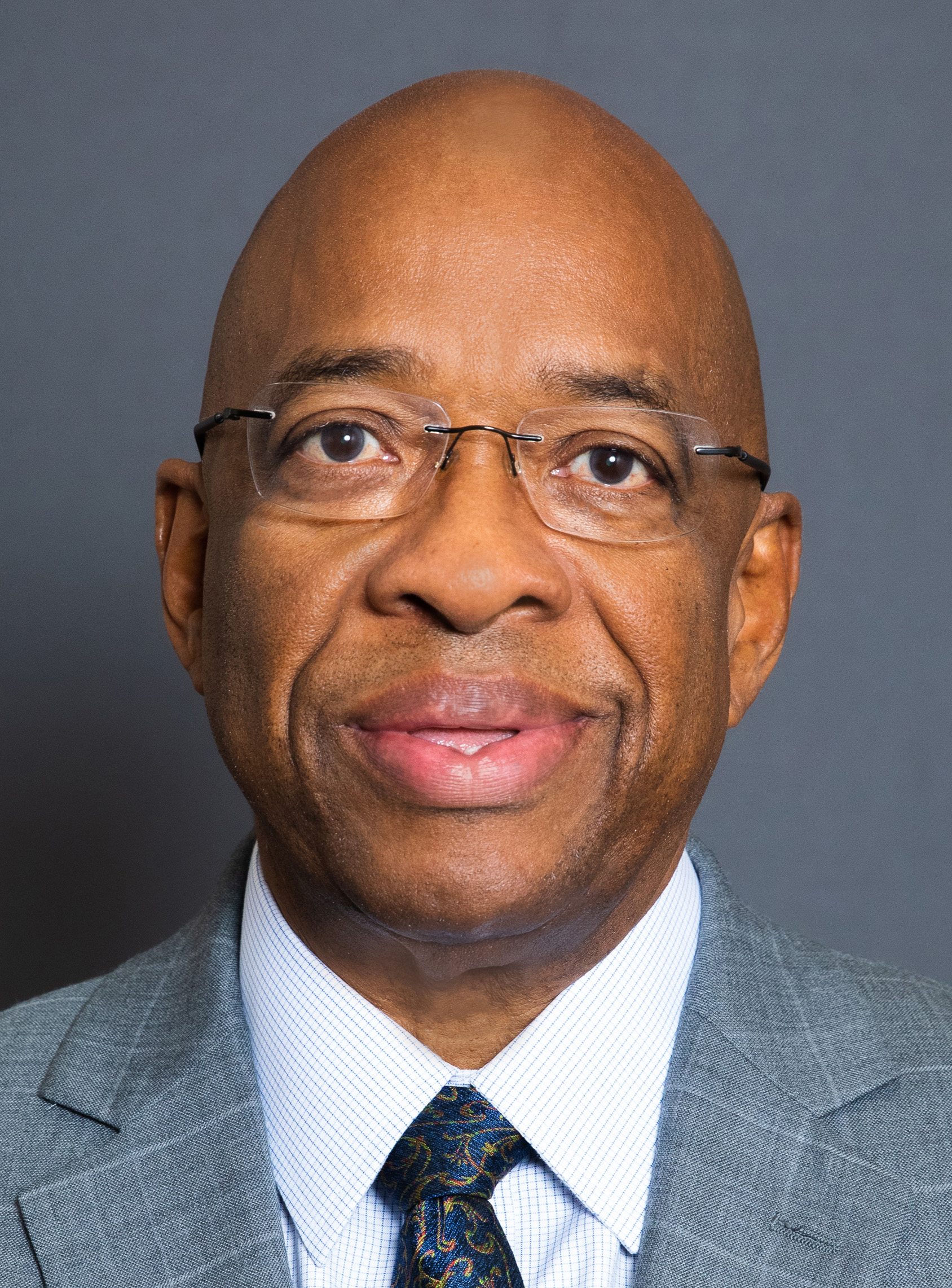

Member of the Georgia House of Representatives from the 129th district
- Incumbent
- Assumed office January 9, 2023
- Preceded by: Henry Howard

Personal details
- Born: Augusta, Georgia, U.S.
- Party: Democratic
- Relatives: Henry Howard (brother)
- Education: Lucy Craft Laney High School
- Alma mater: LaGrange College

Karlton Leander Howard is an American politician from the Georgia Democratic Party who serves as a member of the Georgia House of Representatives representing District 129.

Howard is a minister of religion. Howard ran in special election to replace his brother Henry Howard.
