= Herseth =

Herseth is a surname. Notable people with the surname include:

- Adolph Herseth (1921–2013), American trumpeter
- Erik Herseth (1892–1993), Norwegian sailor and Olympic gold medallist
- Læge Storm Herseth (1897–1985), Norwegian chess player
- Lars Herseth (born 1946), American politician from South Dakota
- Lorna Herseth (1909–1994), American politician from South Dakota
- Max Herseth (1892–1976), Norwegian rower and Olympic bronze medallist
- Ralph Herseth (1909–1969), American politician from South Dakota
- Stephanie Herseth Sandlin, born 1970, American politician, granddaughter of Ralph

== See also ==
- Herseth family, American political family including Ralph and Stephanie
