= Larry Diedrich =

American politician (born 1957)

Member of the South Dakota Senate from the 4th district
- In office January 9, 2001 – January 26, 2004
- Preceded by: Harold Halverson
- Succeeded by: Al Kurtenbach

Member of the South Dakota House of Representatives from the 4th district

Member of the South Dakota House of Representatives
- In office January 14, 1997 – January 9, 2001 Serving with Robert R. Weber
- Preceded by: Pat Eidsness
- Succeeded by: Jim Peterson; Tim Begalka

Personal details
- Born: June 25, 1957 (age 69) Brookings County, South Dakota
- Party: Republican
- Spouse: Jackie Shanks
- Children: 4 (Joshua, Brandi, Christopher, Mikkail)
- Education: South Dakota State University
- Occupation: Farmer

Larry Diedrich (born June 25, 1957) is a Republican politician from South Dakota who served as a member of the South Dakota Senate from the 4th district from 2001 to 2004 and as a member of the South Dakota House of Representatives from the 4th district from 1997 to 2001. He was the Republican nominee in the 2004 special and general elections for the state's at-large congressional district, losing both times to Stephanie Herseth.

== Early life ==
Diedrich was born in Brookings County, South Dakota, in 1957, and graduated from Elkton High School in Elkton in 1975. He later attended South Dakota State University, graduating in 1979.

== South Dakota Legislature ==
In 1996, Diedrich was elected to the South Dakota House of Representatives from the 4th district, which included Brookings, Deuel, Grant, and Moody counties in northeastern South Dakota, serving alongside Robert R. Weber. He was re-elected in 1998.

Diedrich ran for the South Dakota Senate in 2000, and defeated Weber, who ran as an independent candidate. He was re-elected in 2002. He resigned from the legislature on January 26, 2004, after winning the Republican nomination for Congress.

== 2004 congressional campaigns ==
Republican Congressman Bill Janklow, who represented the state's at-large congressional district, resigned in 2004 following a conviction for manslaughter. Diedrich won the Republican nomination to succeed Janklow in the ensuing special election, defeating former State Senator Barbara Everist. In the June 1, 2004, general election, he faced Democrat Stephanie Herseth, an attorney and the granddaughter of former Governor Ralph Herseth. Herseth narrowly defeated Diedrich, winning 51 percent of the vote to his 49 percent.

The same day as the special election, Diedrich won the Republican primary for Congress, and faced Herseth again in the regular November election. Despite President George W. Bush's landslide victory and Republican John Thune's narrow victory over Senator Tom Daschle, Herseth defeated Diedrich by an increased margin, winning 53 percent of the vote to his 46 percent and Libertarian Terry Begay's 1 percent.

== Later career ==
In 2006, Diedrich sought to return to the legislature, challenging incumbent Democrat Jim Peterson for re-election. He was narrowly defeated by Peterson in the general election, receiving 47 percent of the vote to Peterson's 53 percent..
