= 2004 United States House of Representatives election in South Dakota =

South Dakota regional election

- November 2, 2004
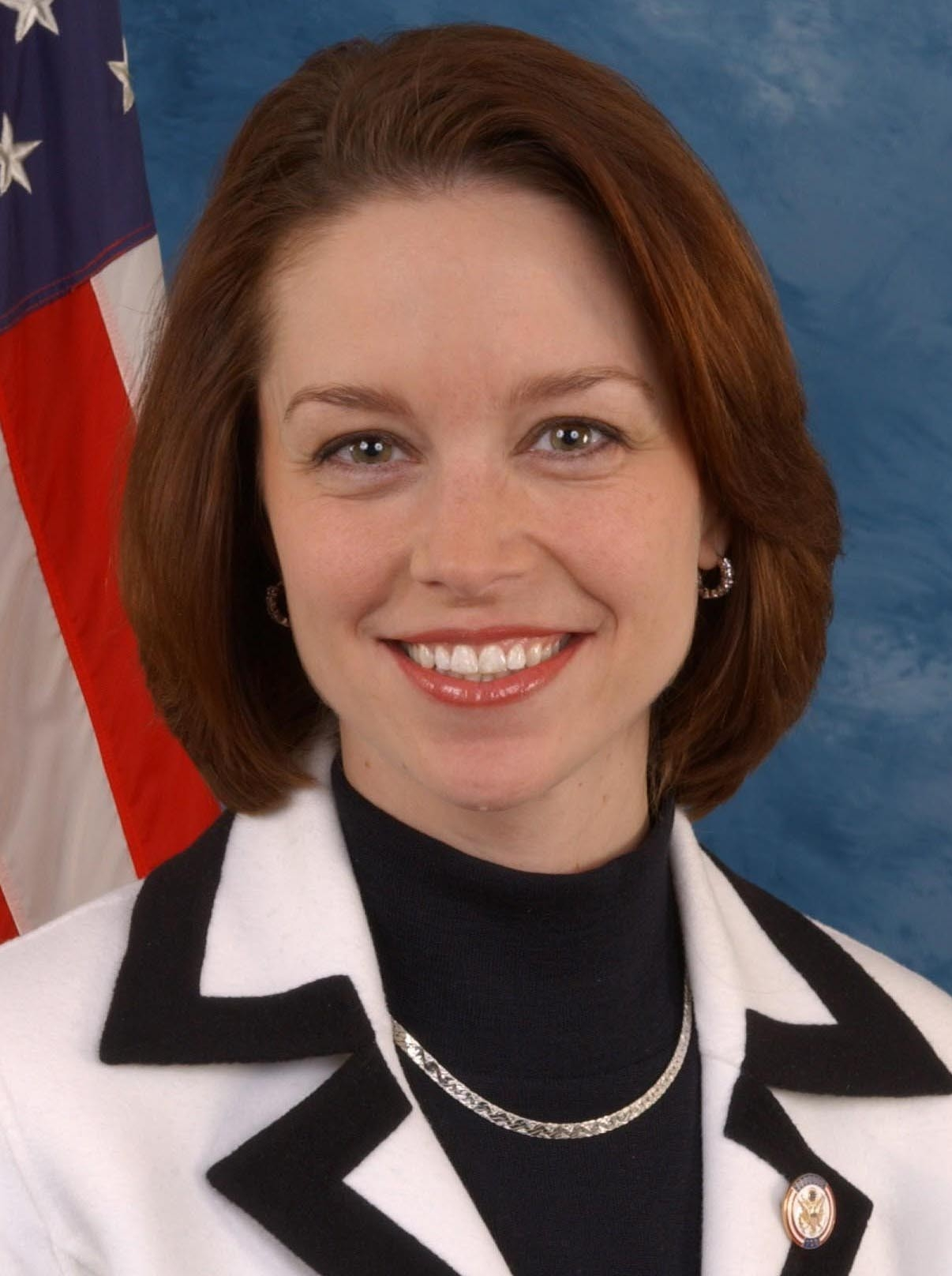

Nominee	Stephanie Herseth	Larry Diedrich
Party	Democratic	Republican
Popular vote	207,837	178,823
Percentage	53.36%	45.91%
- County results Herseth: 50–60% 60–70% 70–80% 80–90% Diedrich: 40–50% 50–60% 60–70% 70–80%
U.S. Representative before election
Stephanie Herseth
Democratic
Elected U.S. Representative
Stephanie Herseth
Democratic

The 2004 United States House of Representatives election in South Dakota took place on Tuesday, November 2, 2004. Voters selected a representative for their single at-large district, who ran on a statewide ballot.

In the regularly scheduled election in November 2004, freshman incumbent Stephanie Herseth and state Senator Larry Diedrich, who had run in the July 2004 special election earlier, faced each other in a rematch; Libertarian candidate Terry L. Begay also ran in this election.

Herseth again prevailed, this time by a wider margin of 53% to 46%, despite President George W. Bush's dominant 59.9% to 38.4% over Senator John Kerry in South Dakota in the 2004 presidential election, as well as Senate Democratic Leader Tom Daschle's narrow loss in the state's concurrent election for U.S. Senate.

== General election ==
=== Predictions ===
Source	Ranking	As of
The Cook Political Report	Lean D	October 29, 2004
Sabato's Crystal Ball	Lean D	November 1, 2004

=== Results ===
South Dakota's at-large congressional district election, 2004
Party	Candidate	Votes	%
Democratic	Stephanie Herseth (incumbent)	207,837	53.36%
Republican	Larry Diedrich	178,823	45.91%
Libertarian	Terry Begay	2,808	0.72%
Total votes		389,468	100.00%
Democratic hold			

=== Counties that flipped from Republican to Democratic ===
- Charles Mix (Largest city: Wagner)
- Union (Largest city: Dakota Dunes)
- Edmunds (largest city: Ipswich)
- Stanley (largest city: Fort Pierre)
- Turner (largest city: Parker)
- Hand (largest city: Miller)

=== Counties that flipped from Democratic to Republican ===
- Clark (largest city: Clark)
- McCook (largest city: Salem)
- Davison (largest city: Mitchell)
- Kingsbury (Largest city: De Smet)
