= Daktronics =

American sign company

Daktronics, Inc.
- Type: Public
- Traded as: Nasdaq: DAKT
- Industry: Electronics
- Founded: 1968; 58 years ago
- Founder: Aelred J. Kurtenbach; Duane Sander
- Headquarters: Brookings, South Dakota, United States
- Key people: Ramesh Jayaraman (President and CEO)
- Products: Timing and Display systems
- Revenue: ▲US$838.71 million (2025)
- Net income: ▲US$4.35 million (2025)
- Number of employees: 2,422 (2024)
- Website: daktronics.com

Daktronics, Inc. is an American company based in Brookings, South Dakota, that designs, manufactures, sells, and services video displays, scoreboards, digital billboards, dynamic message signs, sound systems, and related products. It was founded in 1968 by two South Dakota State University professors.

== History ==
Daktronics was founded in 1968 by Al Kurtenbach and Duane Sander, professors of electrical engineering at South Dakota State University in Brookings, South Dakota. The name is a portmanteau of "Dakota" and "electronics". The company wanted to get into the medical instrument field, but the company's founders found that field too large for them, so they changed their focus to providing electronic voting systems for state legislatures; their first client was for the State of Utah's legislature.

Shortly after, South Dakota State University's wrestling coach, Warren Williamson reached out to the company and asked them to devise a better scoreboard for wrestling. The result was Daktronics' first entry into the scoreboard field, developing the Matside wrestling scoreboard, the first product in the company's line. The company's scoreboards were later used at the 1976 Olympic Games. In 1980, Daktronics developed scoreboards which were used at the 1980 Winter Olympics in Lake Placid, New York. Daktronics displays have since been used at the 1992, 1996 and 2000 Summer Olympics.

In 1984, a new manufacturing facility was built. In 1987, the company developed a mobile scoring system for the PGA tour. In 1994, Daktronics, Inc. became a publicly traded company, offering shares under the symbol DAKT on the NASDAQ National Market system. The company also established an office in Germany in 2003, and in Hong Kong and the United Kingdom in 2004. In 2000, Daktronics acquired Keyframe services, and established an office in Canada. The following year, they installed their first LED video display in Times Square for TDK Financial Services Firm.

The company upgraded the "Zipper" sign in Times Square in 1997, and the first Prostar large screen video displays were installed that year. Indianapolis Motor Speedway installed 18 Prostar displays in 1999. In 2004, the largest video board in North America was installed at Jacobs Field in Cleveland, Ohio, by Daktronics. In 2005, Daktronics installed a multi-million dollar system in Kuwait stock exchange. They also acquired Sportsound system designer and manufacturer. Daktronics acquired the Vortek family of products from New York–based rigging company Hoffend and Sons. In 2008, Daktronics installed a high-definition LED video display for the Kansas City Royals, and in 2014, Daktronics installed an HD display for the Jacksonville Jaguars at EverBank Field, which at the time was the largest such display in the world.

Daktronics established an office in Brazil in 2012, and in 2013, the company acquired OPEN Out Of Home in Belgium. Sales of Daktronics products surpassed $600 million in 2015.

In February 2023, a class action lawsuit was filed against Daktronics alleging securities fraud between March 10, 2022, and December 6, 2022. In 2026, Daktronics was implicated in the Los Angeles Clippers salary cap scandal, helping Clippers owner Steve Ballmer funnel money to star player Kawhi Leonard.

== Operation ==
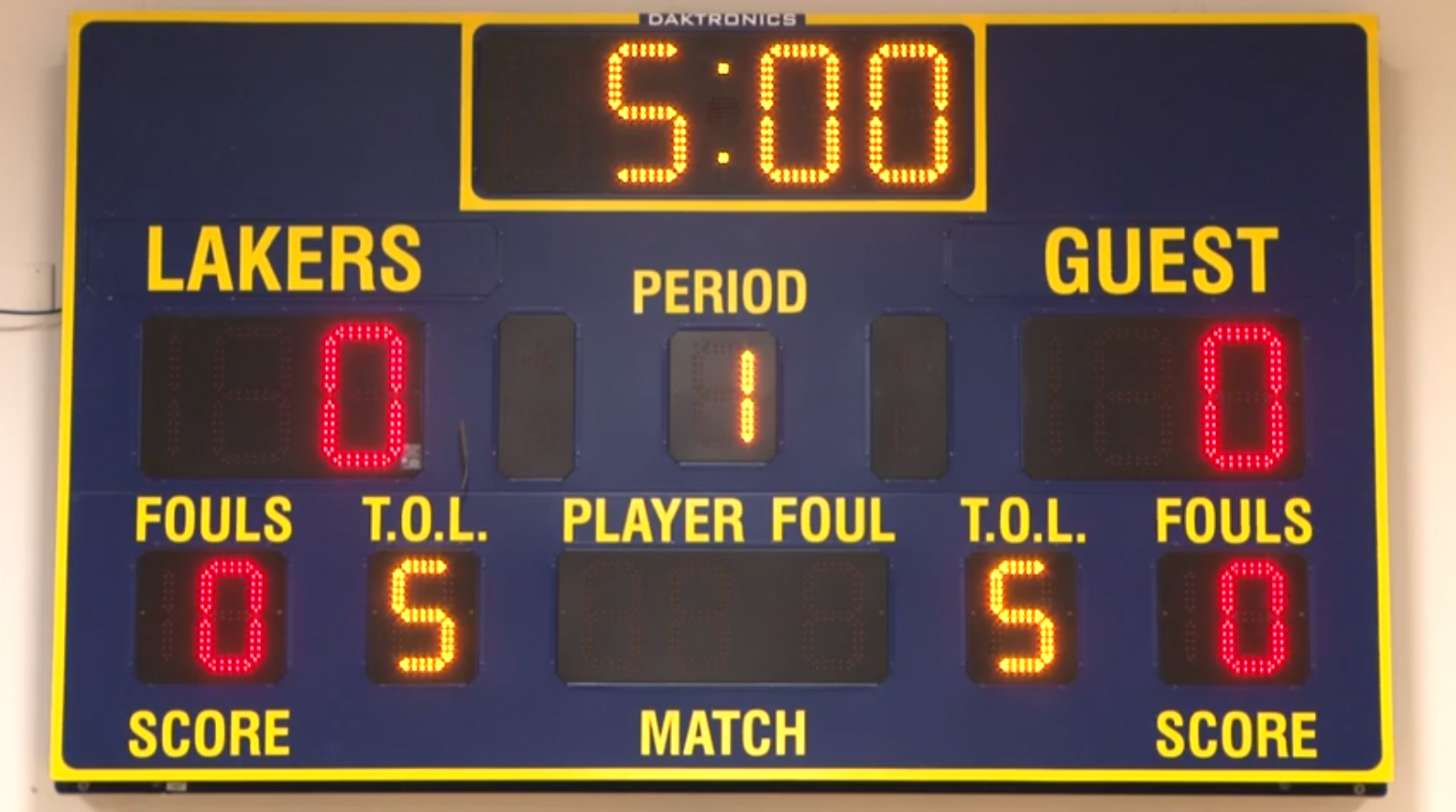
A Daktronics Scoreboard, installed in a high school gymnasium

Daktronics is headquartered in Brookings, South Dakota, with other facilities in Sioux Falls, Redwood Falls, Minnesota, Shanghai, and Belgium. Daktronics Creative Services designs digital content in HD video, 3D animation and motion graphics, specializing in media networks and large-scale LED displays.

The company is involved in sports displays and marketing. Daktronics has supplied scoreboards and video displays for the Olympic Games; however, due to official sponsorships with other timing providers such as IBM, Omega SA and Swiss Timing, displays are Daktronics-manufactured but utilize timing and front-facing branding for other companies. Daktronics has been an influence in National Basketball Association rule changes in the 2000s. The company manufactured the first backboard light strips to comply with buzzer beater instant replay rulings, and in 2004, developed a see-through shot clock to improve spectator visibility.

== See also ==
- Aquatic timing system
- List of largest video screens
- Scoreboard
