= Senator Herseth =

Senator Herseth may refer to:

- Lars Herseth (born 1946), South Dakota State Senate
- Ralph Herseth (1909–1969), South Dakota State Senate

== See also ==
- Herseth family, American political family
