= BBC Alerts =

BBC Alerts was a free-to-use desktop software package issued by the BBC (but developed by Skinkers Ltd.) that allows users to see news as it happens on a scrolling desktop news ticker or as a pop-up alert every hour. Users can customise what news topics they are interested in.

On 30 March 2011, BBC announced they would close the service within weeks, and the service was shut down.
