= Lorna Herseth =

American politician

Lorna Buntrock Herseth

Secretary of State of South Dakota
- In office 1973–1979
- Governor: Richard F. Kneip
- Preceded by: Alma Larson
- Succeeded by: Alice Kundert

Personal details
- Born: April 5, 1909 Columbia, South Dakota, U.S.
- Died: September 8, 1994 (aged 85) Houghton, South Dakota, U.S.
- Party: Democratic
- Spouse: Ralph Herseth (m. 1937; died 1969)
- Children: 3
- Relatives: Stephanie Herseth Sandlin (granddaughter)
- Profession: Teacher

Lorna Buntrock Herseth (April 5, 1909 – September 8, 1994) was an American politician of the Democratic Party who served as Secretary of State of South Dakota from 1973 to 1979.

== Personal life ==
Herseth was born in Columbia, South Dakota on April 5, 1909. Her parents, Albert and Ida Yeske Buntrock, were German immigrants. She was the youngest of 11 children. Herseth attended Northern State Teacher's College and earned a teaching credential after two years of study.

She married Ralph Herseth, who served as Governor of South Dakota from 1959 to 1961, on December 23, 1937. They had dated for nine years prior to getting married. Together they had three children, Karen, Connie, and Lars.

Their son, Lars Herseth, served in the South Dakota State Legislature. Their granddaughter, Stephanie Herseth Sandlin, served in the United States House of Representatives. Herseth served as mentor to Sandlin. During her life, Herseth lived in Houghton, South Dakota and in Pierre, South Dakota. She was a Lutheran. She died at her home on the Herseth Ranch in Houghton on September 8, 1994, and was buried in Houghton Cemetery.

== Career ==
After college, Herseth taught in the Brown County public schools as well as in urban schools. In 1936, Herseth was elected as Brown County Superintendent of Schools. For seven years, she served on Brown County's Reorganization School Board. She later served on the Selby School Board.

Four years after Ralph's death, activists approached Herseth about running for state office herself. She twice was elected Secretary of State of South Dakota, and served from 1973 to 1979.

== Public service ==
Herseth served on the board of directors for the Brown County Red Cross and as the state director of the Easter Seal Society for Crippled Children and Adults.

Party political offices
Preceded by Ruth Eubank	Democratic nominee for Secretary of State of South Dakota; 1972, 1974	Succeeded by Saundra Meyer
