= Jamestown L.P. =

American real estate investment and management company

- Type: Private
- Industry: Real estate
- Founded: 1983; 43 years ago
- Founder: Christoph Kahl
- Headquarters: Atlanta, Georgia, United States
- Key people: Matt Bronfman (CEO); Christoph Kahl (chairman); Michael Phillips (president)
- Parent: Simon Property Group (50%)
- Website: www.jamestownlp.com

Jamestown L.P. is an American real estate investment and management company based in Atlanta, Georgia. The company invests in commercial and mixed-use real estate developments in several cities in the United States. Among Jamestown's properties is the One Times Square building, the site of the annual New Year's ball drop in Manhattan, New York, as well as Ponce City Market in Atlanta and Industry City in Brooklyn. As of 2018, Jamestown maintained more than $11 billion in assets under management.

== History ==
Jamestown was founded in 1983 by the German investor Christoph Kahl. The company was initially backed by investors primarily located in Germany. In one of its first high-profile acquisitions in 1997, Jamestown purchased One Times Square in Manhattan, New York, from Lehman Brothers for $110 million. The property is the site of the annual New Year's ball drop celebration.

In 2004, Jamestown invested $300 million into the General Motors Building on Fifth Avenue in Manhattan.

By 2012, One Times Square had brought in more than $23 million in revenue as its billboards are visible to millions of pedestrians each year.

Twelve months before the onset of the 2008 financial crisis, Jamestown liquidated 75% of its investments and reimbursed the proceeds to its investors. The company then made more than $500 million of real estate investments in 2010 including acquiring a former Sears building from the city of Atlanta which was redeveloped into Ponce City Market.

In 2011, Jamestown acquired full ownership of Chelsea Market (located across the street from 111 Eighth Avenue) adding to the 75% stake in the building acquired in 2003. After a total investment of $790 million in the property, Jamestown later sold Chelsea Market to Google's parent company, Alphabet Inc., in 2018 for $2.4 billion.

The company also made a large investment in the Back Bay area of Boston, Massachusetts in 2012. Jamestown's properties along Boston's Newbury Street encompassed 15% of the buildings on the street being developed as a shopping district. Purchased for $226 million, the Back Bay area property was sold to the North Carolina-based Asana Partners in 2018 for nearly $300 million.

In 2013, Jamestown acquired for $54 million the retail portion of Ghirardelli Square in San Francisco, a 100,394-square-foot property near Fisherman's Wharf. Along with partners, the company also acquired a 50% stake in Industry City, a 16-building complex covering 6 million square feet. Jamestown planned a $100 million investment in renovations.

In 2019, Jamestown acquired the San Francisco Levi's Plaza for an estimated $820 million. In December 2019, Jamestown began marketing an investment fund that targets individuals, with a minimum investment of $2,500.

In 2022, Simon Property Group acquired a 50% stake in Jamestown from the latter's original partners.
