= Al Kurtenbach =

American electrical engineer (born 1934)

Member of the South Dakota Senate from the 4th district
- In office January 27, 2004 – January 2005
- Preceded by: Larry Diedrich
- Succeeded by: Jim Peterson

Personal details
- Born: January 3, 1934 (age 92) Dimock, South Dakota, US
- Party: Republican
- Profession: electrical engineer

Aelred J. (Al) Kurtenbach (born January 3, 1934) is an American electrical engineer. He appointed to the South Dakota State Senate in 2004 to complete the term of Larry Diedrich.

Kurtenbach is the founder of Daktronics, Inc., based in Brookings, South Dakota. He attended the South Dakota School of Mines and Technology, the University of Nebraska and Purdue University. He was also a professor at South Dakota State University. He was awarded an honorary degree from Purdue University in 2011 and one from South Dakota State in 2007. He has been a member of the Brookings School Board, South Dakota Board of Regents, Education Committee for the South Dakota Chamber of Commerce & Industry, South Dakota Enterprise Institute, and the board of the National Association of Manufacturers
