= 2004 South Dakota's at-large congressional district special election =

- June 1, 2004
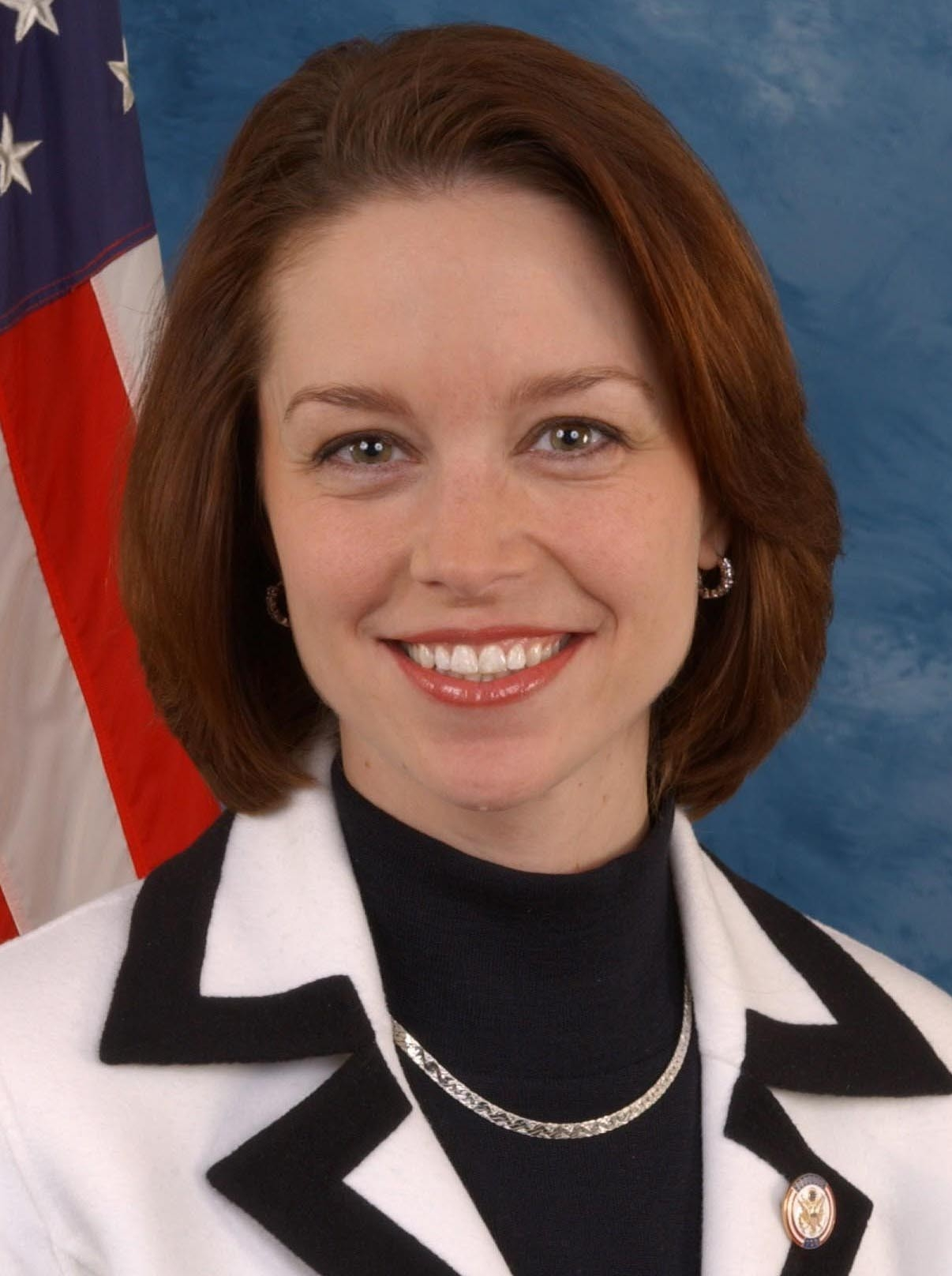

Nominee	Stephanie Herseth	Larry Diedrich
Party	Democratic	Republican
Popular vote	132,420	129,415
Percentage	50.57%	49.43%
- County results Herseth: 50–60% 60–70% 70–80% 80–90% >90% Diedrich: 50–60% 60–70% 70–80%
U.S. Representative before election
Bill Janklow
Republican
Elected U.S. Representative
Stephanie Herseth
Democratic

The 2004 South Dakota's at-large congressional district special election, which was held on June 1, 2004, was triggered by the January 20, 2004 resignation of Republican Representative Bill Janklow following a conviction of vehicular manslaughter after an accident that had occurred in August 2003. Each party held a nominating convention to choose their nominee for the special election. Republicans nominated Larry Diedrich over Barbara Everist, also a South Dakota State Senator. Democrats chose attorney Stephanie Herseth, who had unsuccessfully challenged Janklow in 2002.

The special election was closely watched by both parties in an effort to gain momentum going into the 2004 House elections. The Hill committees of both parties spent a combined total of two million dollars on advertising in South Dakota. This election was especially important considering that in November 2004, in addition to this House seat, also up for election was Democratic Senator and Senate Minority Leader Tom Daschle, who was facing a tough race against John Thune, who had only lost his bid for South Dakota's other U.S. Senate seat in 2002 by 524 votes.

Herseth benefitted from her high name recognition from her previous run as well as her relation to the prominent Herseth family (one notable member of whom includes her grandfather Ralph Herseth, a former Governor of South Dakota). Vice President Dick Cheney came to South Dakota in March to campaign for Diedrich.

Herseth narrowly prevailed over Diedrich as this made her the first woman elected in the Congress from the state of South Dakota since Gladys Pyle in 1938 Senate special election and the first Democratic woman to do so. Both of them also won the regular primaries held on the same day as the special election, with Herseth winning a full term in November 2004 in a rematch with Diedrich. Some Democrats claimed this special election victory, as well as another one in Kentucky's 6th congressional district months earlier, were harbingers of major Democratic victories in November. However, instead Republicans expanded their majorities in both congressional chambers, net-gaining three House seats and four Senate seats.

== Results ==
South Dakota's at-large congressional district special election, 2004
Party	Candidate	Votes	%
Democratic	Stephanie Herseth	132,420	50.57%
Republican	Larry Diedrich	129,415	49.43%
Total votes		261,835	100.00%
Democratic gain from Republican			

=== Counties that flipped from Republican to Democratic ===
- Kingsbury (Largest city: De Smet)
- Lake (Largest city: Madison)
- Marshall (Largest city: Britton)
- Miner (Largest city: Howard)
- Minnehaha (Largest city: Sioux Falls)
- Moody (Largest city: Flandreau)
- Grant (Largest city: Milbank)
- Brule (Largest city: Chamberlain)
- Sanborn (Largest city: Woonsocket) (previously tied)
- Spink (largest city: Redfield) (previously tied)
- Yankton (largest city: Yankton)
- Jackson (largest city: Kadoka)

== See also ==
- 2004 United States elections
- 108th United States Congress
