= Alma Larson =

American politician

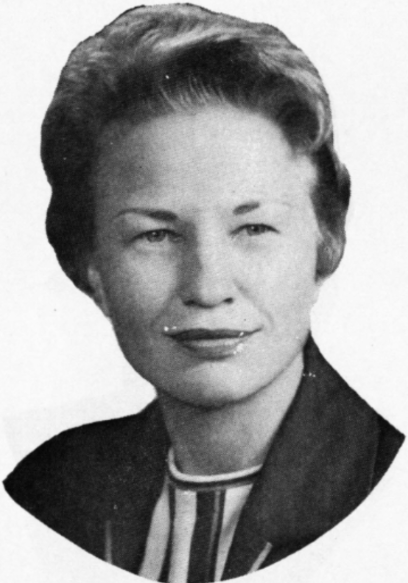
- Larson in 1965

22nd Secretary of State of South Dakota
- In office 1965–1973
- Governor: Nils Boe; Frank Farrar; Richard F. Kneip
- Preceded by: Essie Wiedenman
- Succeeded by: Lorna Herseth

Personal details
- Born: May 21, 1932; Vivian, South Dakota, U.S.
- Died: September 2, 2012 (aged 80)
- Political party: Republican

Alma Larson (May 21, 1932 – September 2, 2012) was an American politician. She served as secretary of state of South Dakota from 1965 to 1973.

== Life and career ==
Larson was born in Vivian, South Dakota and attended Vivian High School. After graduating from high school, she completed "business, secretarial, and political science courses" at the Opportunities Institute of Denver. After completing her schooling, she worked for state government in South Dakota, rising to become Deputy Secretary of State under Essie Wiedenman.

Larson served as secretary of state of South Dakota from 1965 to 1973.

Larson died on September 2, 2012, at the age of 80.
