= Motograph News Bulletin =

New York City lighted moving news ticker since 1928

The Motograph News Bulletin, also known as the Zipper, was a 380-foot-long electromechanical news ticker display that wrapped around One Times Square.

== History ==
=== Development and installation ===
Frank C. Reilly and Francis EJ Wilde, both engineers at Motogram, developed the technology used in the display. While similar illuminated displays existed at the time, they all had disadvantages. Wilde patented many devices which helped overcome these shortcomings.

In 1926, Reilly proposed the idea of installing a news ticker bulletin on the Times Tower to the owner of the New York Times Adolph Ochs and deputy Arthur Hays Sulzberger. They all signed a contract July 26, 1928.

It took 8 weeks to install the display, with work being done 24 hours a day in order to meet the contracted deadline. The Times wanted to pay a maximum of $50,000 but due to the fact it was unique and custom manufactured along with several difficulties unforeseen during the installation process, Motogram ended up paying $80,000 for it. This led to increased animosity between the two companies.

The first headline displayed was the announcement of Herbert Hoover's victory over Al Smith on November 6, 1928. The display read: HOOVER DEFEATS AL SMITH.

The New York Times wrote and published an article, titled HUGE TIMES SIGN WILL FLASH NEWS, describing the device.

=== Subsequent history ===
The Motograph quickly became an icon of New York City. It appeared in many films of the time.

On May 18, 1942, it was extinguished for the first time in history in order to comply with the black-out orders given by the military.

On the morning of August 14, 1945 at 07:30 (EST), the following message was displayed on the Motograph: ***OFFICIAL - TRUMAN ANNOUNCES JAPANESE SURRENDER***. James Torpey, the person responsible for composing the headlines and general operation, had spent nearly a day in order to make sure the headline was correct. He came up with the idea of adding 3 stars to the beginning and end of the headline which represented the 3 branches of the American armed forces. Almost 750,000 people crowded around the building to read the headline, the largest audience the Motograph would ever see, likely due to the proliferation of television.

The Motograph operated continuously until 1961, when the Times moved out of the building. The tower was subsequently purchased by Allied Chemical in 1963. The display was put back into service in 1965 but would only operate sporadically, with some gaps lasting several years.

In 1975, the Motograph was extinguished. Newsday rented the display in 1980, putting it back into service once more. However, in December 1994, Newsday announced the lease would terminate at the end of the month, citing profitability, with Chiara Coletti commenting "Frankly, there's not that much bang for the buck."

=== Replacement ===
The Motograph was eventually replaced by a new display in 1997, utilizing 227,200 amber LEDs. The headlines were sourced from The Wall Street Journal.

In 2019, as part of new renovations, the 1997 display was removed, being replaced in 2025 by a newer, multicolored display, with a 324-foot wrap-around display, and a resolution of 100 × 8,220 pixels.

== Technical aspects ==
=== Exterior display ===
The display wrapped around the 3rd floor of the building. It was made up of 14,800 incandescent bulbs distributed in a rectangular frame 368 feet (112 meters) long and 5 feet (1.5 meters) tall. Each of the letters displayed consisted of a matrix 12 bulbs vertically and 7 bulbs horizontally. All of these bulbs were connected by vast amount of wiring to the device which allowed the letters to be displayed.

=== Composition of headlines ===
In order to compose a headline, an operator would place thin metal plates 19 by 7.6 cm (7.5 by 3.0 in) with the letters making up the headlines in relief onto a frame. The frame would move along a conveyor belt to a field of brushes, each connected to individual light bulbs. This would cause the light bulbs to flash in a manner making up the individual letters, thus displaying the headline.
