= Houghton, South Dakota =

Houghton
- Unincorporated community
- Location within the state of South Dakota Houghton (the United States)
- Coordinates: 45°45′47″N 98°12′37″W
- Country: United States
- State: South Dakota
- County: Brown
- Elevation: 1,303 ft (397 m)
- Time zone: UTC-6 (Central (CST))
  - Summer (DST): UTC-5 (CDT)
- ZIP codes: 57449
- Area code: 605
- GNIS feature ID: 1255680

Houghton is an unincorporated community in Brown County, South Dakota, United States. Its population is not tracked by the Census Bureau.

== History ==
Houghton was platted in 1886. It was named for C. W. Houghton, an original owner of the town site. A post office was established in Houghton in 1886.

== Notable people ==
- Ralph Herseth, twenty-first Governor of South Dakota from 1959 to 1961.
- Stephanie Herseth Sandlin, Former U.S. Representative and president of Augustana University.
