= Robert R. Weber =

American politician (1925–2021)

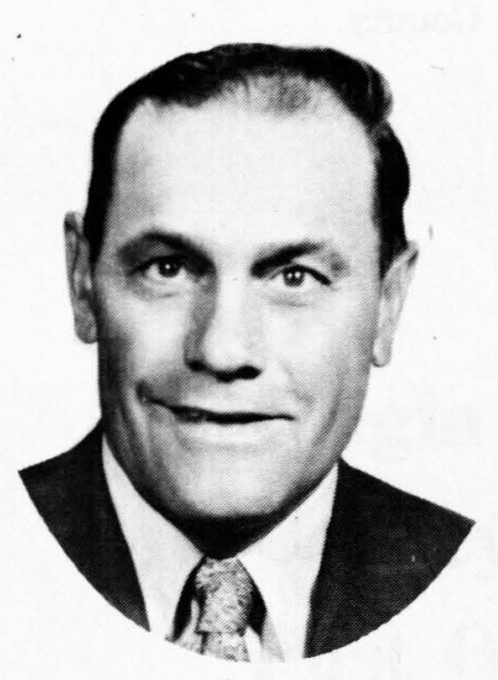
- Weber circa 1973

Member of the South Dakota House of Representatives from the 3rd district
- In office 1973–2000

Personal details
- Born: November 19, 1925 Watertown, South Dakota
- Died: September 24, 2021 (aged 95) Clear Lake, South Dakota
- Party: Republican
- Spouse(s): Shirley V. Roe (m. June 3, 1948)
- Children: four
- Profession: farmer

Robert R. Weber (November 19, 1925 – September 24, 2021) was an American politician in the state of South Dakota. He was a member of the South Dakota House of Representatives from 1973 to 2000. He was a farmer and former chairman of his local school board. Weber died on September 24, 2021.
