= News ticker =

Text strip describing important events

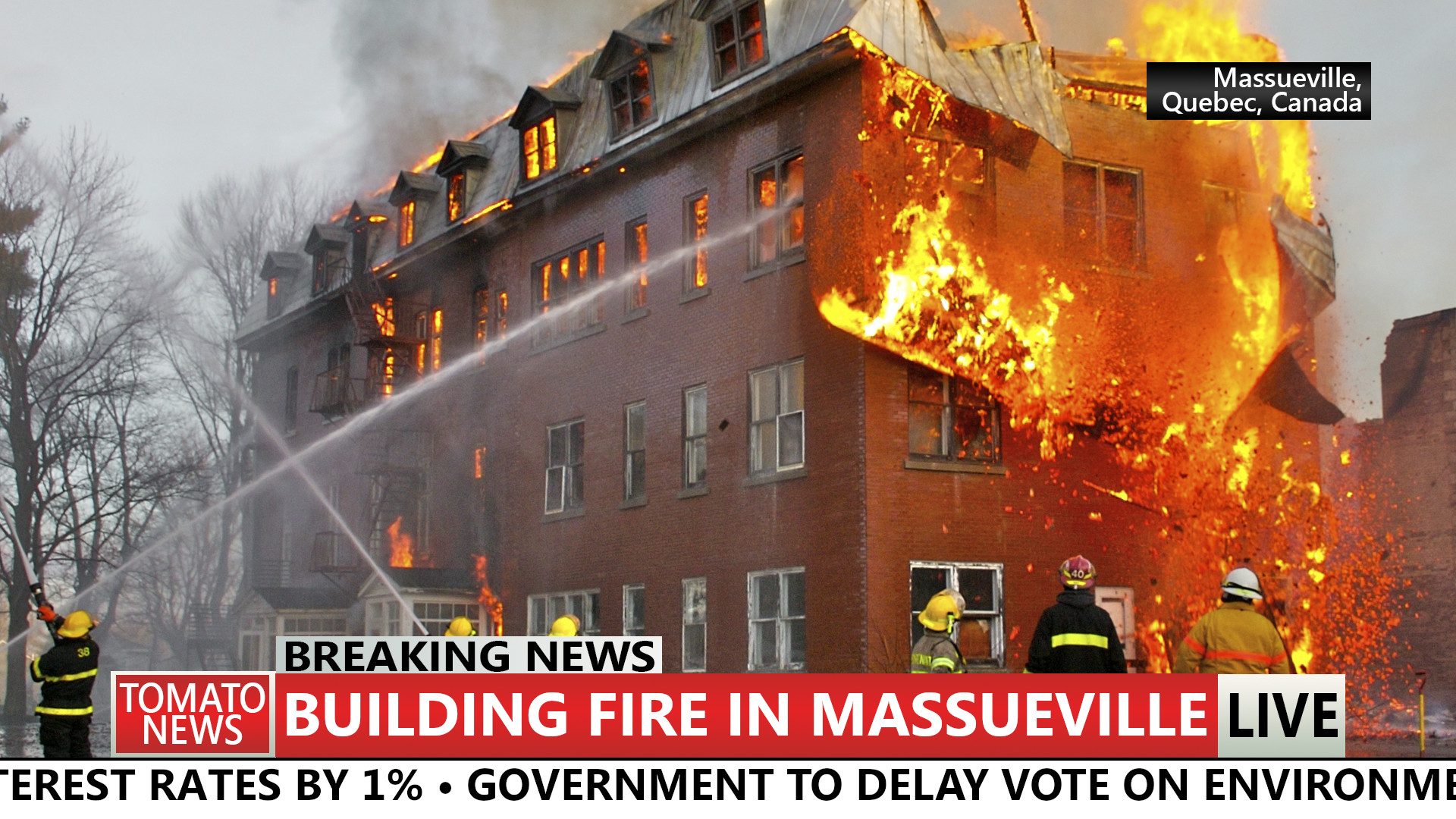
An example of a television news ticker, at the very bottom of the screen

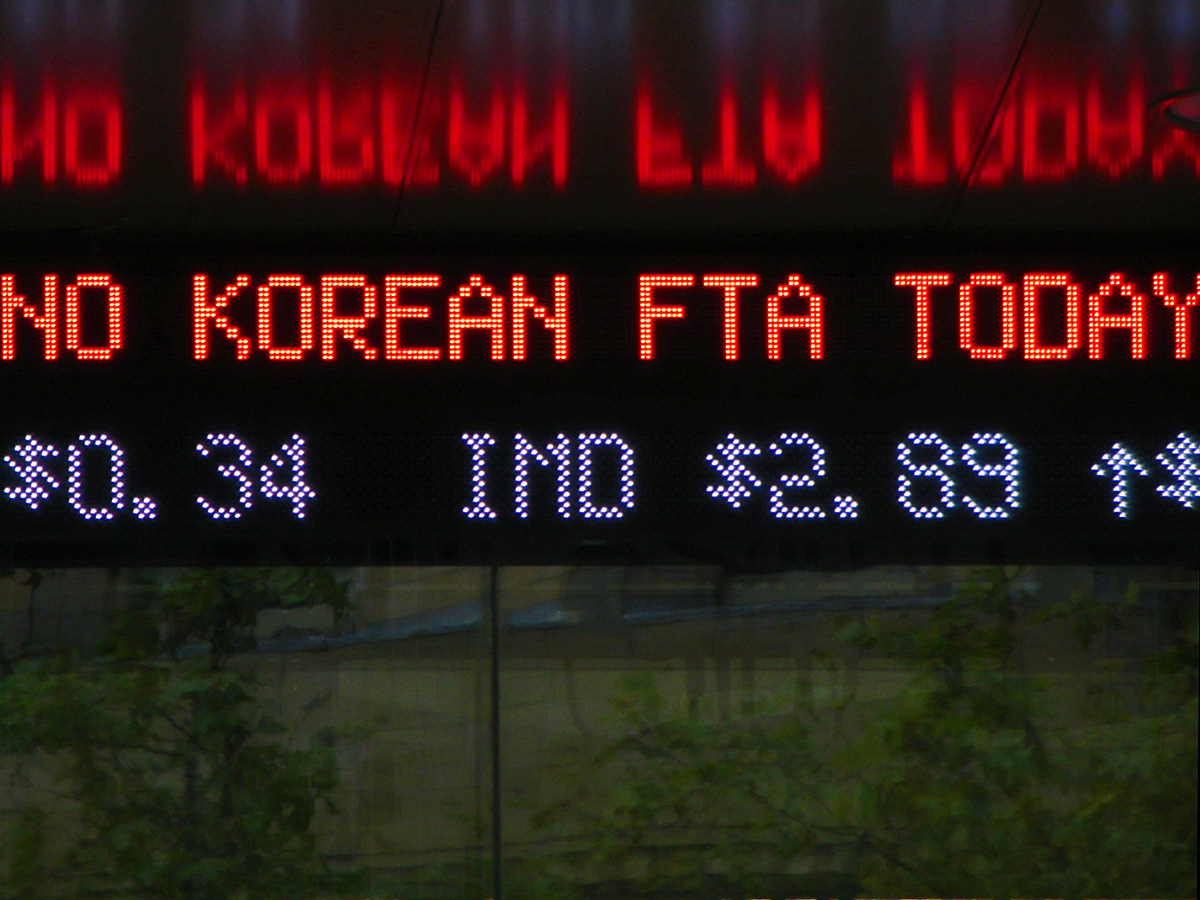
News ticker on a building in Sydney, Australia

A news ticker (sometimes called a crawler, crawl, slide, zipper, ticker tape, or chyron) is a horizontal or vertical (depending on the language's writing system) text-based display either in the form of a graphic that typically resides in the lower third of the screen space on a television station or network (usually during news programming) or as a long, thin scoreboard-style display seen around the facades of some offices or public buildings dedicated to presenting headlines or minor pieces of news. It is an evolution of the paper strips tapes, a continuous paper print-out of stock quotes from a printing telegraph which was mainly used to transmit companies' share price information over telegraph lines before the advance of technology in the 1960s.

News tickers have been used in Europe in countries such as United Kingdom, Germany and Ireland for some years; they are also used in several Asian countries and Australia. In the United States, tickers were long used on a special event basis by broadcast television stations to disseminate weather warnings, school closings, and election results. Sports telecasts occasionally used a ticker to update other contests in progress before the expansion of cable news networks and the Internet for news content. In addition, some ticker displays are used to relay continuous business and financial information.

Most tickers are traditionally displayed in the form of scrolling text running from right to left across the screen or building display (or in the opposite direction for right-to-left writing systems such as Arabic script and Hebrew), allowing for headlines of varying degrees of detail; some used by television broadcasters, however, display stories in a static manner (allowing for the seamless switching of each story individually programmed for display) or utilize a "flipping" effect (in which each individual headline is shown for a few seconds before transitioning to the next, instead of scrolling across the screen, usually resulting in a relatively quicker run through of all of the information programmed into the ticker). Since the growth in usage of the World Wide Web, some news tickers have syndicated news stories posted largely on websites of broadcasters or by other independent news agencies.

== Current uses ==
=== Television ===
The presentation of headlines or other information in a news ticker has become a common element of many different news networks. The use of the ticker has differed on a number of channels:

- News networks and local newscasts commonly use a setup in which news headlines are scrolled across an area near the bottom of the screen, though some variations have formed, such as showing one headline at a time with a scrolling or "flipper" effect.
- Financial news channels use two or more tickers displaying company shares prices and business headlines.
- Networks with a focus on sports often use a slightly different system, where scores and statuses of ongoing and finished games are displayed one by one, along with minor sports highlights, statistics and sports news headlines. They are typically divided into categories devoted to specific leagues and events (with college basketball and football usually focusing on the top 25 ranked teams on the AP Poll, occasionally supplemented by sections for specific conferences).
- Some programs, including news-based programs emphasizing viewer interactivity, or special events, may also use tickers to display messages and reactions from viewers and others that relate to the program. These comments are often sourced from social networking services such as Facebook and X, typically curating comments from a specific page or hashtag.

Due to their current prevalence, they have been occasionally been made targets of pranks and vandalism. In one such example, News 14 Carolina allowed viewers to submit relevant information such as school closings or traffic delays via telephone or the Internet that would be incorporated into the ticker; the system was exploited in February 2004 to display humorous and crude messages, including the infamous "All your base are belong to us". Occasionally messages intended for training accidentally end up being put on the live ticker as happened on BBC News in 2022 when "Weather rain everywhere" and "Manchester United are rubbish" appeared on the live news ticker.

Some businesses and organizations have utilized tickers intended for relaying weather-related closings as a surreptitious source for free guerrilla marketing, proclaiming they were open rather than closed and giving their phone number if possible, allowing them to 'advertise' on a television station all day for free. Since then, many stations have required pre-registration of businesses or organizations with an authorized representative and a signed affidavit on company letterhead affirming their authenticity, along with filtering out unfamiliar businesses and organizations, before being able to display their closing announcements. Stations also confirm all closings involving school districts with authorized officials to prevent situations in which students either show up to canceled classes in dangerous conditions, or do not attend school due to an erroneous, prank-submitted, or false listing.

=== On personal computers ===
Various applications have been developed over time to install news tickers on personal computer desktops using RSS feeds from news organizations, which are displayed in a fashion similar to those used by television channels but enable the user to access to underlying news stories, a feature not offered by traditional television channels. The Bloomberg Terminal and other financial information-tracking programs and devices also utilize tickers.

A ticker may also be used as an unobtrusive method by businesses in order to deliver important information to their staff. The ticker can be set to reappear, stay on screen, or be put into a retractable mode (where a small tab is left visible on-screen).

In the United Kingdom, broadcasters have stopped using this technology as other forms of communications have become available and increased in popularity. BBC News and Sky News discontinued their respective desktop tickers in March 2011 and 2012 to focus on other products, such as smartphone applications, to deliver updated information on breaking news and sport stories.

=== News tickers on buildings ===
Since the advent of the telegraph, newspapers commonly used their buildings to share the latest headlines. At first simple chalkboard signs were used for bulletins, but limelight illumination, electric lights, magic lantern projections, and other novel techniques were later employed. The method of using electric lights to spell out moving letters was invented by Frank C. Reilly (August 20, 1888 – April 10, 1947) and patented in 1923. Reilly called his invention the Motograph News Bulletin.

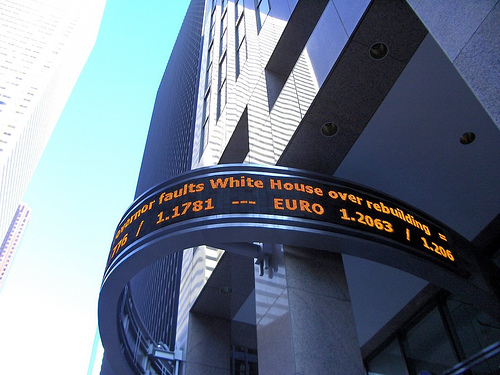
Stock ticker on the Reuters building at Canary Wharf, London

In 1928, The New York Times installed a Motograph News Bulletin to display news headlines on the sides of Times Tower. The display was 388 feet (118 m) long, 5 feet (1.5 m) high, and employed over 14,800 light bulbs. Popularly known as the "Zipper", the sign remained in use until the building was sold in 1961. The sign was darkened during World War II to comply with wartime lighting restrictions. The Motograph operated until 1994 and was replaced by an electronic version in 1995, which was in turn removed in 2017 due to the replacement of all individual screens on the front of One Times Square with a 350 foot (110 m)-tall LED billboard in 2018.

Ticker displays appear today on the exterior of the News Corp Building, which houses the headquarters for Fox News Channel/News Corp in the west extension of Manhattan's Rockefeller Center, as well as one that displays delayed stock market data that is located in Times Square. NASDAQ itself features a large display screen on the facade of the NASDAQ MarketSite building in Times Square.

The Reuters buildings at Canary Wharf and in Toronto have news and stock tickers; the latter type features market data for the New York Stock Exchange, NASDAQ and London Stock Exchange, while the Toronto building's ticker also includes quotes from the Toronto Stock Exchange.

A red-LED ticker was added to the perimeter of 10 Rockefeller Center in 1994, as the building was being renovated to accommodate the studios for NBC's Today. Placed at the juncture of the first and second floors, the ticker is visible to spectators in Rockefeller Plaza and passersby on West 49th Street and updates continuously, even at times when Today is not being produced and broadcast. As of 2015, the ticker strip is only a small part of a large two-floor LCD video display that is placed within the window of the studio showing promotional information.

The Martin Place Headquarters of Seven News, the news division of Australian television broadcaster Seven Network, also incorporates a ticker that wraps around the building.

== In popular culture ==
The use of news tickers has also been parodied on a number of films and television programs, including a 2003 episode of The Simpsons ("Mr. Spritz Goes to Washington"), as well as a sketch featured on Saturday Night Live. Some programs and films such as Austin Powers in Goldmember sometimes place jokes within their parody news crawls. The Onion News Network uses a parody ticker to offer jokes in its online newscasts. The Australian comedy news series CNNNN went a step further: although it featured a joke news ticker throughout the show, one episode featured a news ticker that summarized the initial news ticker, as well as one for the sight impaired, which covered the whole screen.

The music video for the Chamillionaire rap single "Hip Hop Police" incorporated a parodical news ticker announcing the arrests of famous musicians.

== See also ==
- Character generator—a means by which news tickers are created
- Chyron Corporation—a company whose name has become a genericized trademark for a type of news ticker (chyron)
- Television news screen layout
- Ticker tape
