= Lars Herseth =

American politician (1946–2026)

Member of the South Dakota Senate from the 2nd district
- In office 1989–1996

Member of the South Dakota House of Representatives from the 2nd district
- In office 1975–1986

Personal details
- Born: Ralph Lars Herseth; June 16, 1946 Aberdeen, South Dakota, U.S.
- Died: September 12, 2026 (aged 80)
- Party: Democratic
- Spouse: Joyce Styles
- Relations: Ralph Herseth (father); Lorna Herseth (mother)
- Children: 2, including Stephanie
- Education: University of South Dakota
- Profession: Rancher

Ralph Lars Herseth (June 16, 1946 – September 12, 2026) was an American politician. He served in the South Dakota House of Representatives from 1979 to 1986 and in the Senate from 1989 to 1996. He was the son of Ralph and Lorna Herseth.

Herseth died from cancer on September 12, 2026, at the age of 80.

Party political offices
| Preceded by Michael J. O'Connor | Democratic nominee for Governor of South Dakota; 1986 | Succeeded by Bob Samuelson |
