= Barbara Everist =

American politician

Member of the South Dakota Senate from the 14th district
- In office 1995–2002

Member of the South Dakota House of Representatives from the 14th district
- In office 1993–1995

Personal details
- Born: July 6, 1949 (age 77) Sioux Falls, South Dakota
- Party: Republican

Barbara Everist (born July 6, 1949) is an American politician from South Dakota. She served in the South Dakota Legislature from 1993 to 2002, and became the first woman to be elected Majority Leader of the South Dakota Senate in 2001.

== Biography ==
Everist was born on July 6, 1949, in Sioux Falls, South Dakota.

She first ran for office in 1992, running for the South Dakota House of Representatives in District 14. She announced her campaign on April 1, 1992, and won the House election in November, alongside District 14 incumbent Janice Nicolay. (Note: In South Dakota, each legislative district elects one state senator and two state representatives. For state House elections, the two candidates with the most votes are elected representative.) In 1994, she ran again, this time for the South Dakota Senate, and won against Democratic challenger Jim Lyons.

In the South Dakota Senate, Everist served as the Majority Whip from 1997 to 1998, and the Assistant Majority Leader from 1999 to 2000. In 2001, she was elected Majority Leader of the South Dakota Senate, becoming the first woman to hold the position. She left the Senate in 2002.

After leaving politics, Everist later became the chairwoman of the Board of Trustees of Sanford Health. She retired from the position in 2021.
