= Stephanie Herseth Sandlin =

American politician (born 1970)

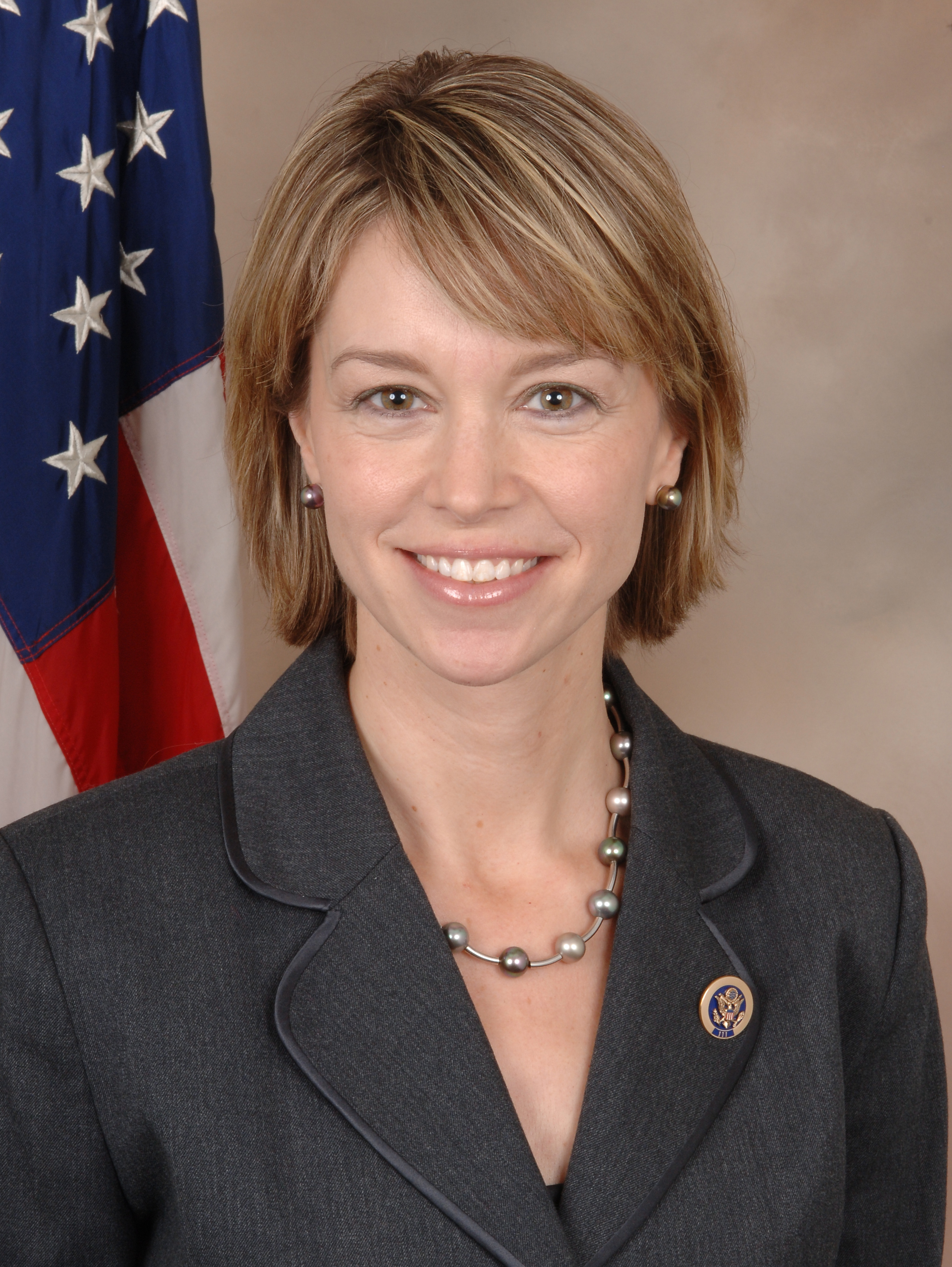
- Official portrait, 2009

President of Augustana University
- Incumbent
- Assumed office August 1, 2017
- Preceded by: Rob Oliver

Member of the U.S. House of Representatives from South Dakota's at-large district
- In office June 1, 2004 – January 3, 2011 (Note: Herseth Sandlin's official service begins on the date of the special election, while she was not sworn in until June 3, 2004.)
- Preceded by: Bill Janklow
- Succeeded by: Kristi Noem

Personal details
- Born: Stephanie Marie Herseth; December 3, 1970 (age 55) Houghton, South Dakota, U.S.
- Party: Democratic
- Spouse: Max Sandlin (m. 2007)
- Children: 1
- Relatives: Lars Herseth (father); Ralph Herseth (grandfather); Lorna Herseth (grandmother)
- Education: Georgetown University (BS, JD)

Stephanie Marie Herseth Sandlin (born December 3, 1970) is an American attorney, university administrator, and politician from the Democratic Party. She represented South Dakota's at-large congressional district in the United States House of Representatives from 2004 until 2011. Sandlin was first elected to Congress in a July 2004 special election and won three full terms before losing to Republican Kristi Noem in 2010. She was the youngest female member of the House, and the first woman elected to the House from South Dakota. Before her 2007 marriage to Max Sandlin, she was known as Stephanie Herseth. She is a Democrat and a member of the Herseth family of South Dakota. She and Senator Tim Johnson are also the last Democrats to win a statewide or federal election in South Dakota.

Since 2017, she has served as president of Augustana University.

== Early life and education ==
Stephanie Herseth was born on December 3, 1970, the daughter of Joyce (née Styles) and Ralph Lars Herseth, and was raised on her family's farm near Houghton. Her father's family had been active for two generations in South Dakota politics. Her paternal grandfather, Ralph Herseth, was the governor of South Dakota, and her paternal grandmother, Lorna Herseth, was South Dakota's secretary of state. Her father, Lars Herseth, served in the South Dakota State Legislature for two decades and ran for governor in 1986. Her ancestry includes German and Norwegian.

Herseth graduated from Groton High School in Groton, South Dakota. She earned her Bachelor of Science from Georgetown University in 1993 and her Juris Doctor from Georgetown University Law Center in 1997.

== Career prior to Congress ==
After law school, Herseth worked as a judicial law clerk to Judge Charles B. Kornmann of the United States District Court for the District of South Dakota and Judge Diana Gribbon Motz on the United States Court of Appeals for the Fourth Circuit. She worked in private practice as an attorney in Washington, D.C., and taught at the Georgetown University Law Center.

Before her election to the House, Herseth was executive director of the South Dakota Farmer's Union Foundation and served on the board of directors of First Bank and Trust of Brookings, South Dakota.

== U.S. House of Representatives ==
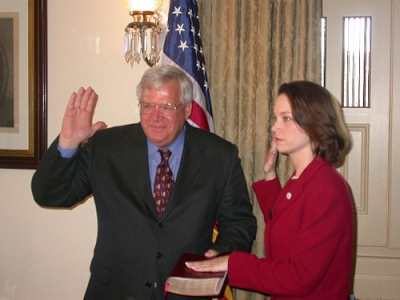
Herseth being sworn in by then-House Speaker Dennis Hastert

=== Committees ===
- Committee assignments: Committee on Agriculture; Subcommittee on Conservation, Credit, Energy, and Research; Subcommittee on General Farm Commodities and Risk Management; Committee on Natural Resources; Subcommittee on National Parks, Forests and Public Lands; Committee on Veterans' Affairs; Subcommittee on Economic Opportunity (Chair); Select Committee on Energy Independence and Global Warming

During her tenure in the House, Herseth Sandlin was assigned to committees of concern to her constituency. The Agriculture Committee affects South Dakota's largest industry, and the Natural Resources Committee has jurisdiction over national forests in the Black Hills and policies affecting the state's nine federally recognized Native American tribes. She was selected to serve on the Select Committee on Global Warming and Energy Independence based upon her work on issues related to biofuels and renewable energy in rural America.

Herseth Sandlin was a senior whip in the House and co-chaired the conservative Democratic Blue Dog Coalition.

=== Voting record ===
Herseth Sandlin voted against the Affordable Health Care for America Act. She said she would "not vote for the Senate bill as is" and would "not vote for a package of changes that would go through the reconciliation process."

Herseth Sandlin opposed her party's leadership on some issues related to gun rights, which won her the support of the NRA Political Victory Fund. She is pro-choice and expressed opposition to Referred Law 6, which sought to ban abortions in South Dakota, including those for victims of incest and rape. She supported the Employment Nondiscrimination Act in 2007.

Early in the 2008 presidential election cycle, Herseth Sandlin supported Senator John Edwards. On February 26, 2008, she endorsed Barack Obama.

== Political campaigns ==
=== 2002 ===
Herseth ran unsuccessfully for the United States House of Representatives in 2002, losing a high-profile race to Republican governor Bill Janklow by a smaller than expected margin.

=== 2004 ===
After Janklow was convicted of manslaughter in a motor vehicle accident, he resigned his seat, effective January 20, 2004, triggering a special election. Herseth was the Democratic nominee, and on June 1, 2004, defeated Republican nominee Larry Diedrich with 51% of the vote. The victory gave South Dakota its first all-Democratic congressional delegation since 1937, including Senators Tom Daschle and Tim Johnson.

In the regularly scheduled election in November 2004, Herseth beat Diedrich again, with 53.4% of the vote. The vote margin in June was about 3,000 votes, but by the November election, which included a hard-fought contest for Daschle's Senate seat, it grew to more than 29,000. Both the 2004 special and general elections were close compared to most House races the country, and garnered national attention.

=== 2006 ===
In November 2006, Herseth easily defeated Republican nominee Bruce Whalen. She received the second-highest vote total for a Democratic candidate for the House in 2006.

=== 2008 ===
In the November 2008 general election, Herseth Sandlin won a landslide victory over lawyer attorney Chris Lien, winning every county in the state.

=== 2010 ===
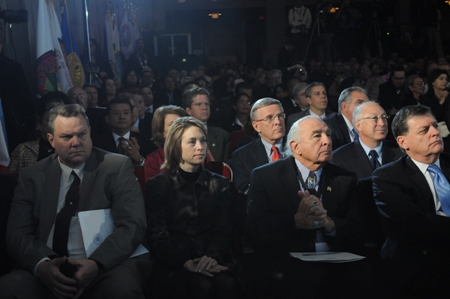
Herseth Sandlin, seated between Senator Jon Tester (D-MT) and former Senator Ben Nighthorse Campbell (R-CO), joins other government officials at a speech given by then-president Barack Obama in December 2010, shortly after she lost her reelection bid

Herseth Sandlin was mentioned as a possible, even likely, candidate for governor of South Dakota in 2010, but announced on July 7, 2009, that she would seek reelection to the House.

Before the Democratic primary, Kevin Weiland, a physician who had begun a campaign against Herseth Sandlin but had not yet filed to be on the ballot, called off his efforts. He said he had "concern for what the net effect would be on our political party retaining the seat in the next Congress, but also after receiving assurances from Stephanie that she will not vote to repeal the recently passed health care reform law." He spoke to Democratic party leaders as well as Herseth Sandlin before making this decision. The Republican nominee, State Representative Kristi Noem, charged that Weiland's decision not to run was due to Herseth Sandlin trading her vote for personal gain. Herseth Sandlin strongly denied the allegation and said there was no quid pro quo arrangement between her and Weiland.

During the campaign, Noem also criticized Herseth Sandlin's husband, Max Sandlin, a lobbyist and former congressman. Noem said his list of clients included companies that had interests in legislation that would come before Congress, and suggested he would have improper influence because of his marriage. The Rapid City Journal editorial board wrote that Herseth Sandlin should take this concern seriously. Roll Call called Noem's charges an attempt "to stoke anti-Beltway emotions". Herseth Sandlin's campaign responded that she did not allow family members to lobby her or her staff.

Herseth Sandlin's campaign was hampered by the state Democratic Party's inability to field a candidate against Republican nominee John Thune for U.S. Senate; "by letting him breeze to re-election, Republicans could turn all their energy and money to the House race, and state Rep. Kristi Noem was able to unseat Rep. Stephanie Herseth Sandlin, the last best hope for a Democratic future in the state."

Noem defeated Herseth Sandlin in the November 2 general election with 48.14% of the vote to Herseth Sandlin's 45.9%.

== Post-congressional career ==
After losing reelection, Herseth Sandlin joined the Washington, D.C., firm of Olsson Frank Weeda Terman Matz as a principal attorney focusing on federal laws and regulations. She told Roll Call that she might register to lobby Congress after the expiration of the mandatory one-year waiting period that bars former members from doing so. Ultimately, she did not register as a lobbyist after the cooling-off period ended.

Although Herseth Sandlin did not run in 2012, political commentators suggested that she might seek the U.S. Senate seat being vacated by Tim Johnson in 2014. Ultimately, she decided not to run, citing her son and her desire to continue in her role as Legal Counsel at Raven Industries in Sioux Falls, South Dakota.

Herseth Sandlin served briefly as an adjunct professor at the Department of Political Science at South Dakota State University. In February 2017, it was announced that she would become the 24th president of Augustana University, a liberal arts college in Sioux Falls.

== Personal life ==
In March 2007, Herseth married Max Sandlin, a four-term Democratic congressman from Texas and registered lobbyist with the lobbying and public relations firm Mercury, who is 18 years her senior. The couple met when Herseth first ran for Congress in 2002. He was defeated for reelection in 2004.

Upon her marriage, she became known as Stephanie Herseth Sandlin. The couple has a son, born in 2008.

== See also ==
- Women in the United States House of Representatives

U.S. House of Representatives
Preceded by Bill Janklow	Memberof the U.S. House of Representatives from South Dakota's at-large congressional district 2004–2011	Succeeded by Kristi Noem
Party political offices
Preceded by Allen Boyd	Chair of the Blue Dog Coalition for Administration; 2009–2011; Served alongside: Charlie Melancon, Jim Matheson (Communications), Baron Hill (Policy)	Succeeded by Heath Shuler
U.S. order of precedence (ceremonial)
Preceded by John Salazar as Former U.S. Representative	Order of precedence of the United States as Former U.S. Representative	Succeeded by Liz Cheney as Former U.S. Representative
